= Virginia Beach, Virginia =

Largest city in Virginia, United States

Virginia Beach
- Independent city
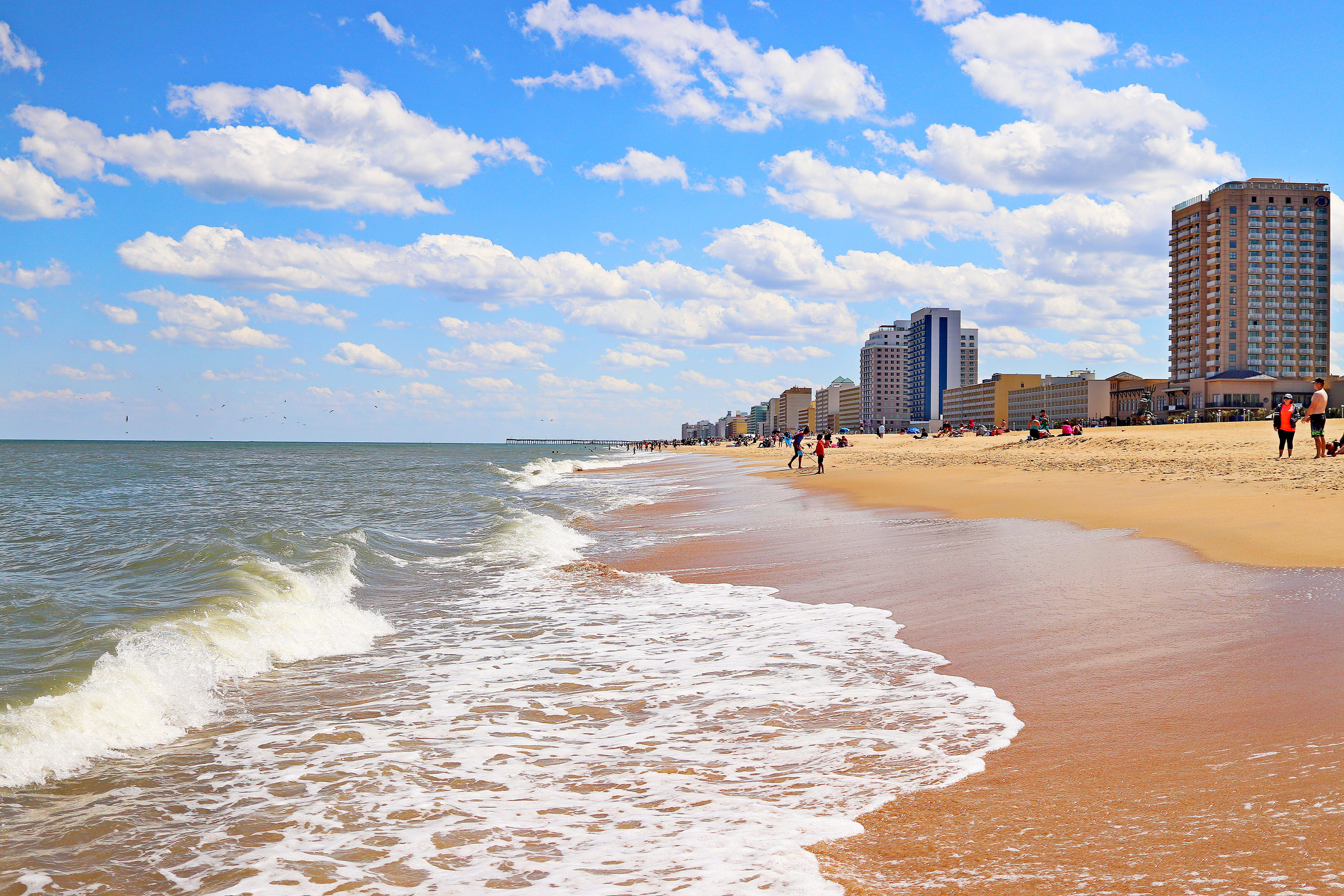
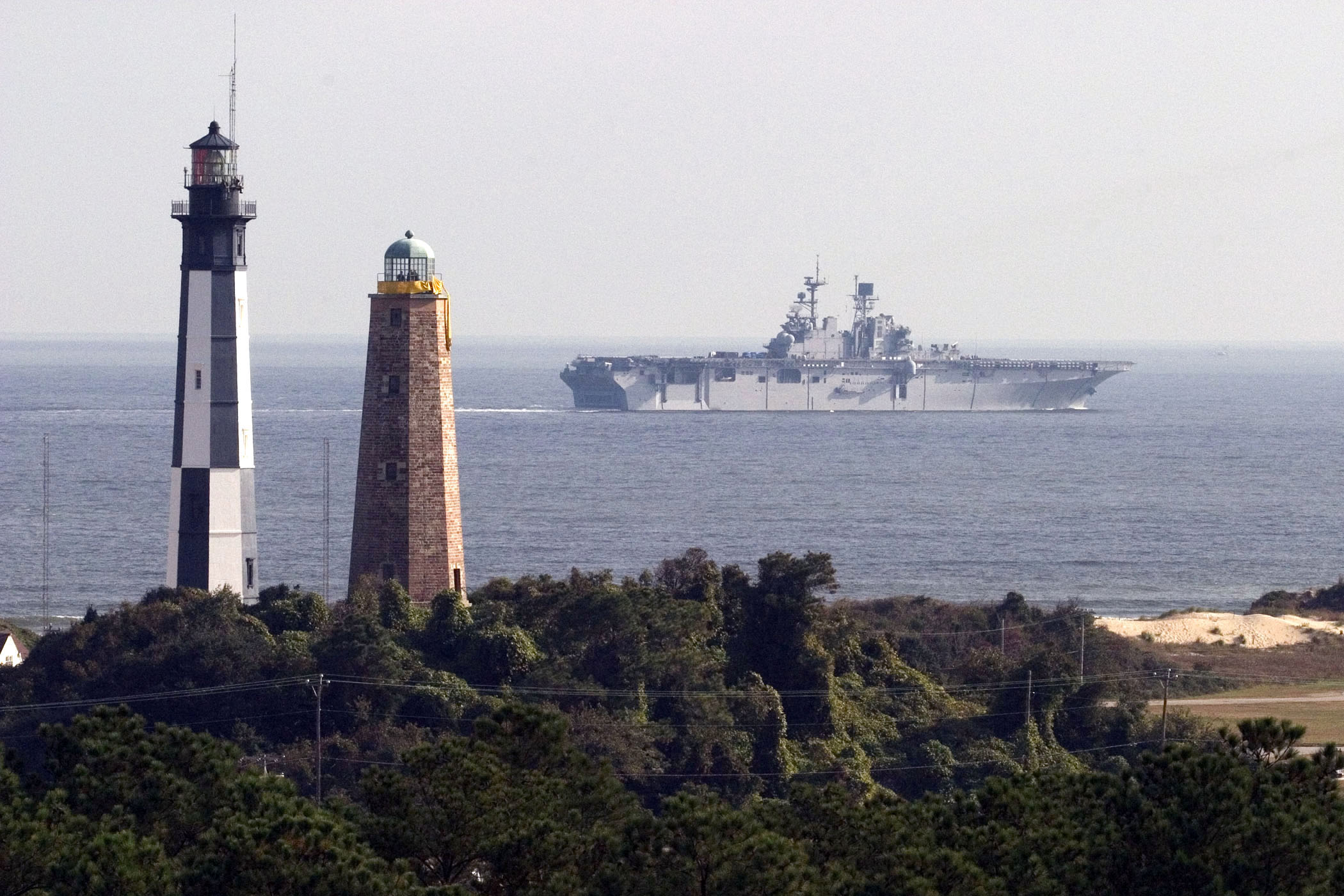
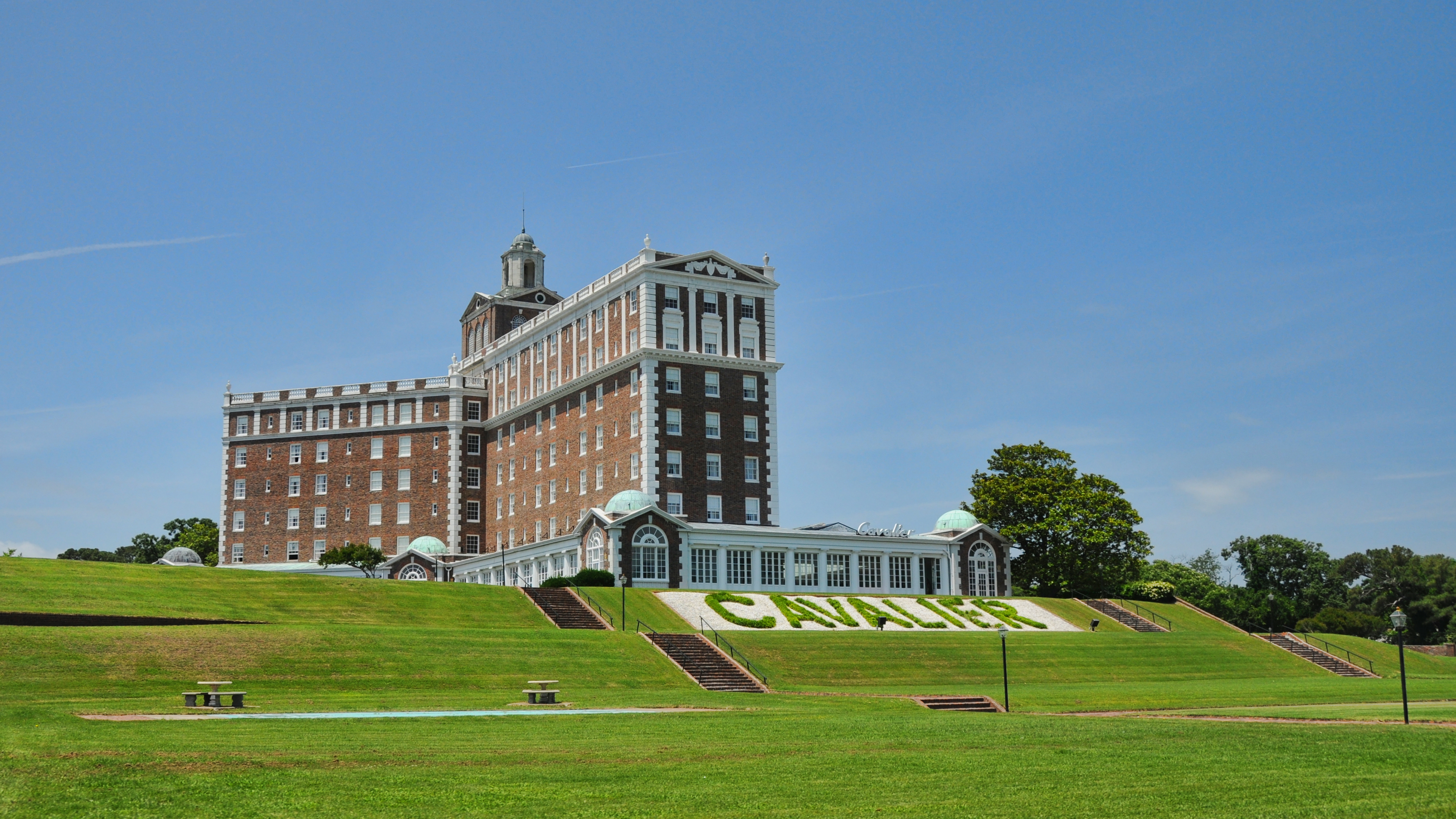
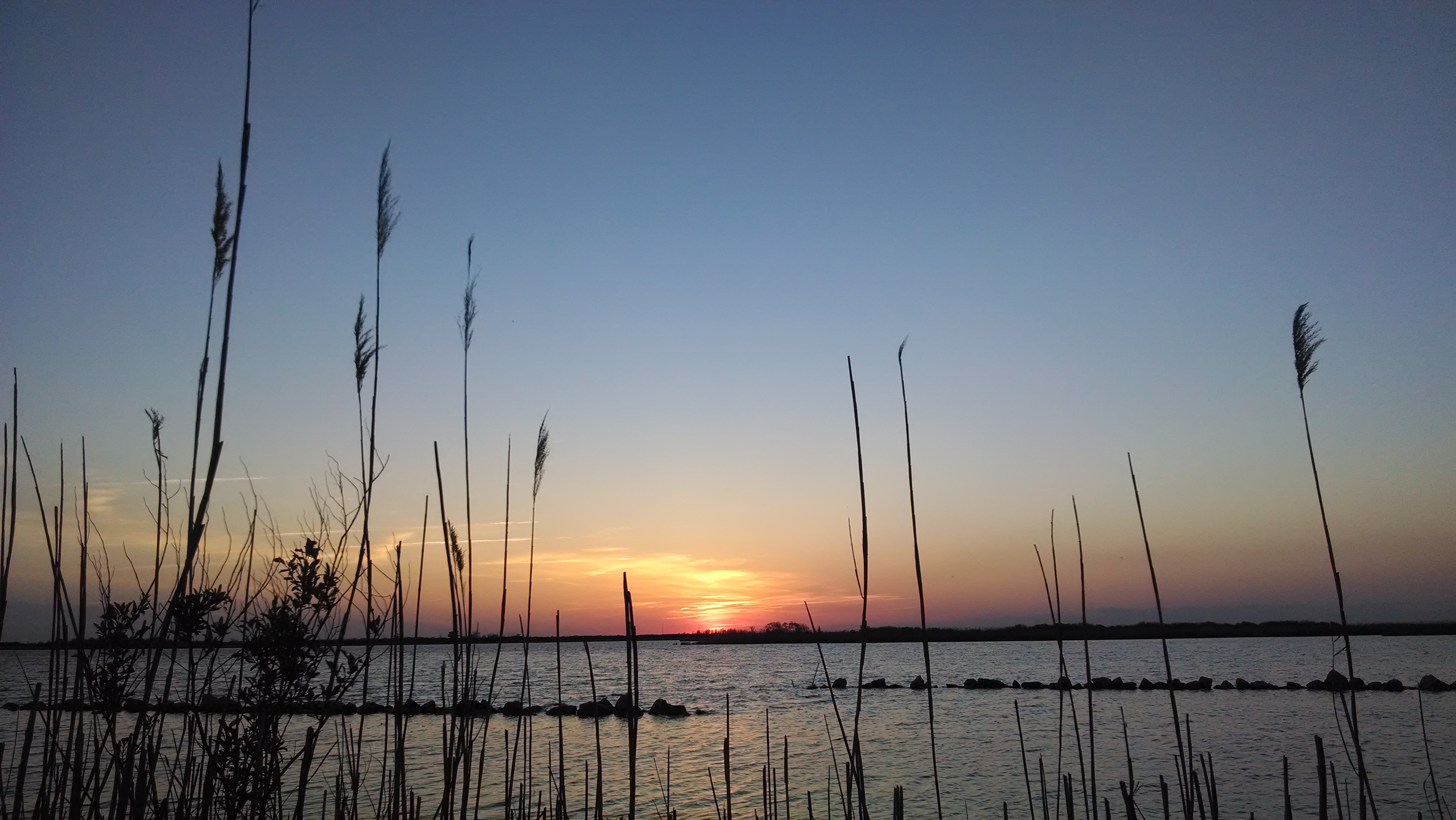
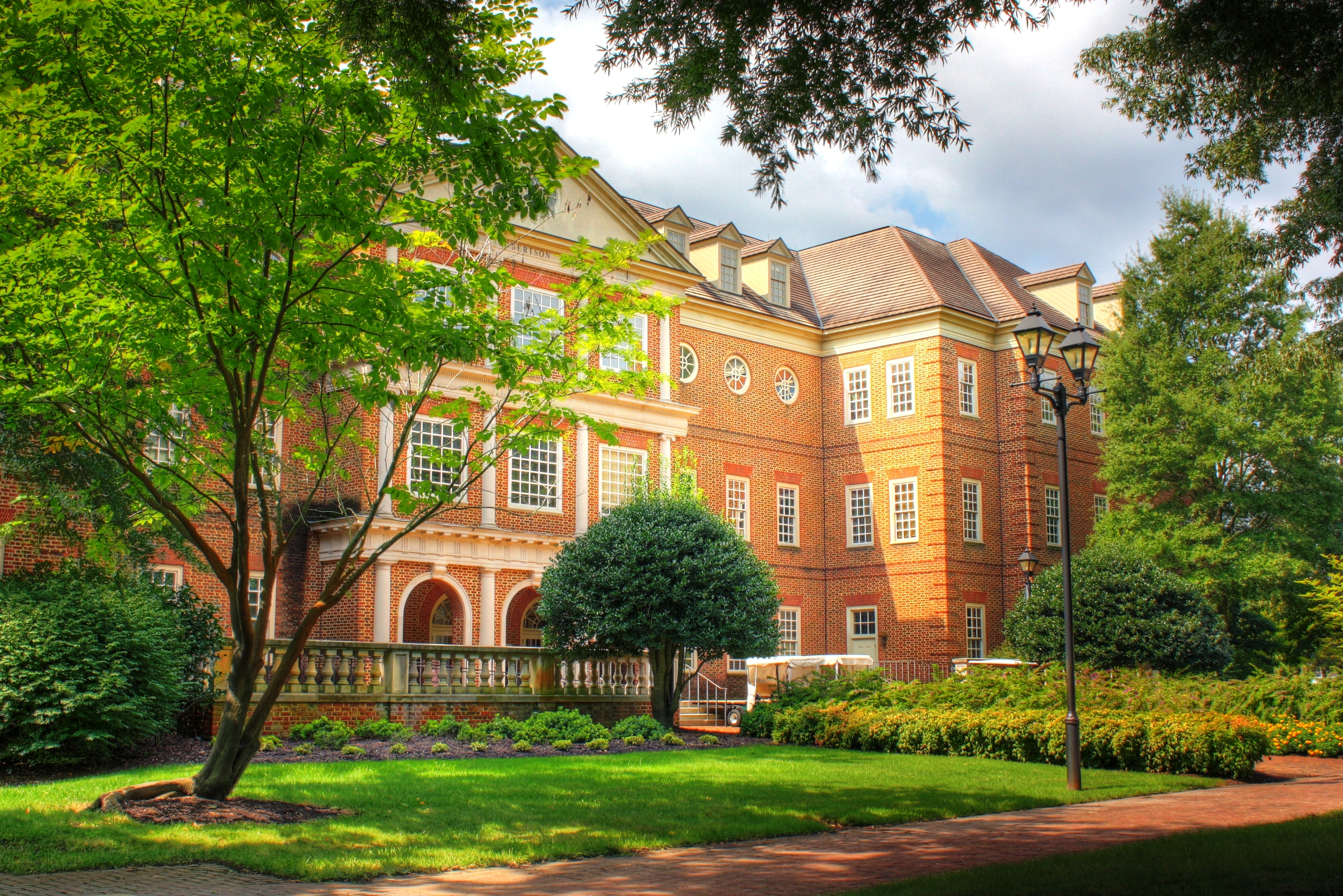
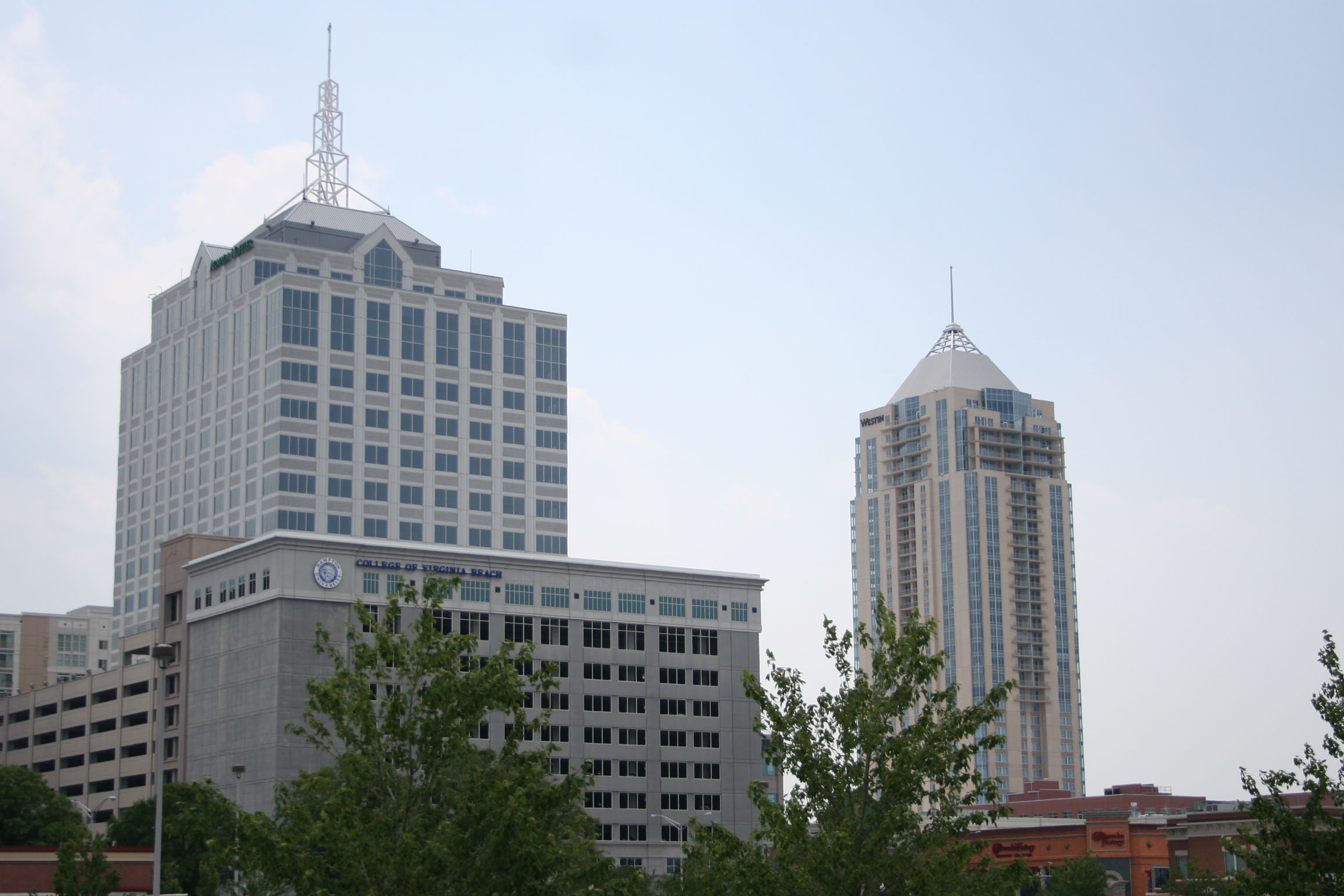
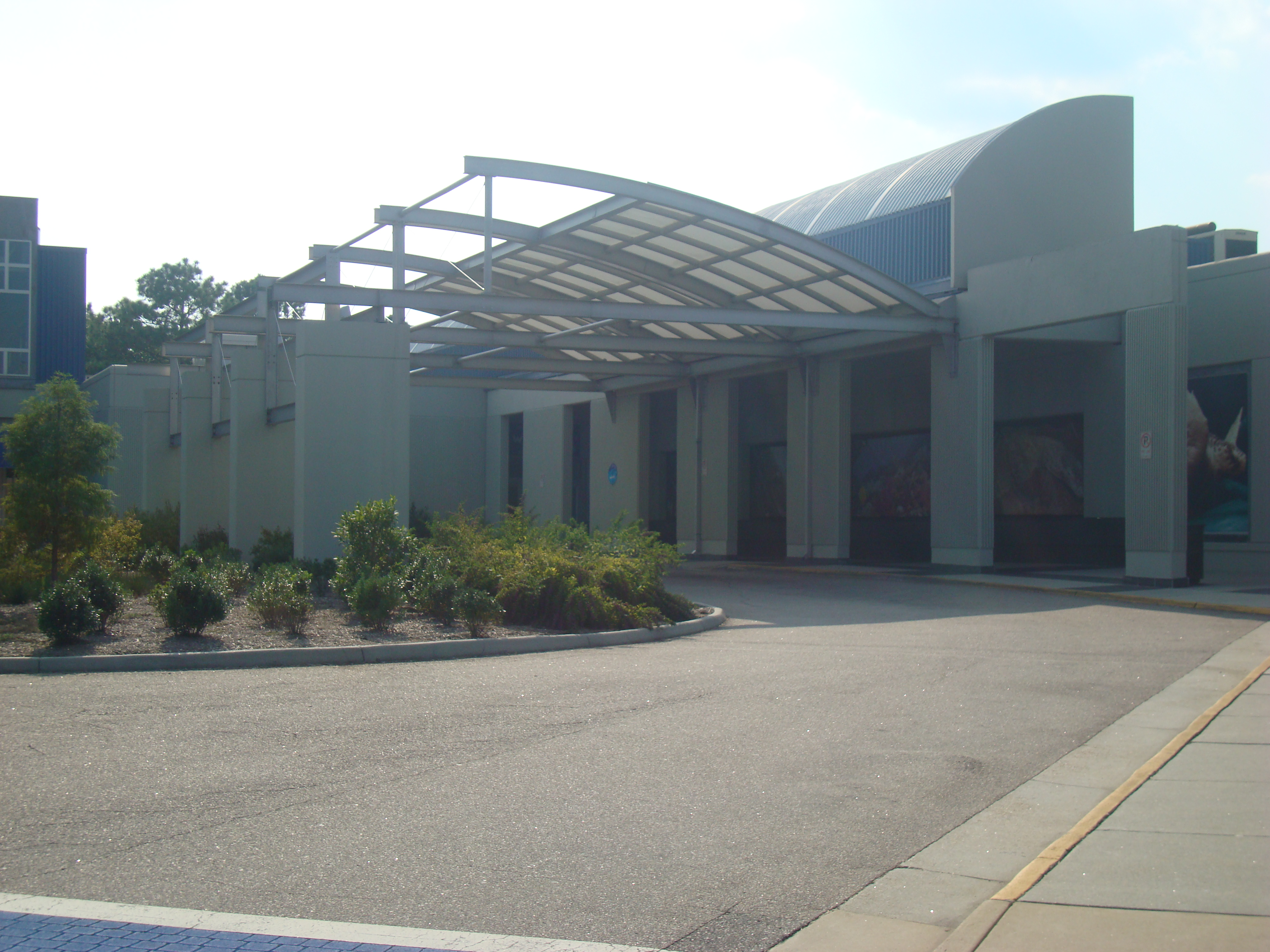
- Virginia Beach Oceanfront Cape Henry Lighthouse Cavalier Hotel Back Bay Wildlife Refuge Regent University Virginia Beach Town Center Virginia Aquarium

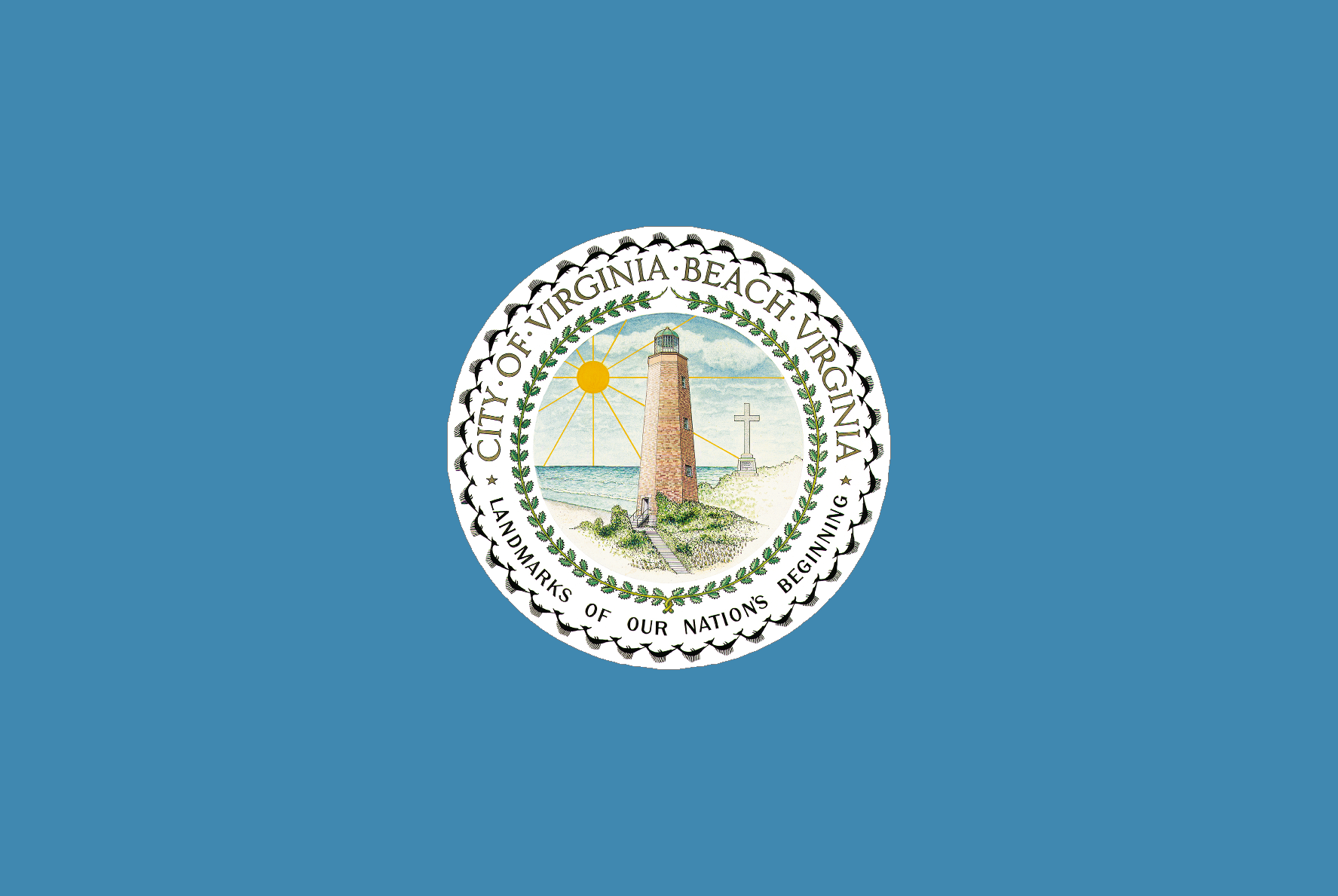
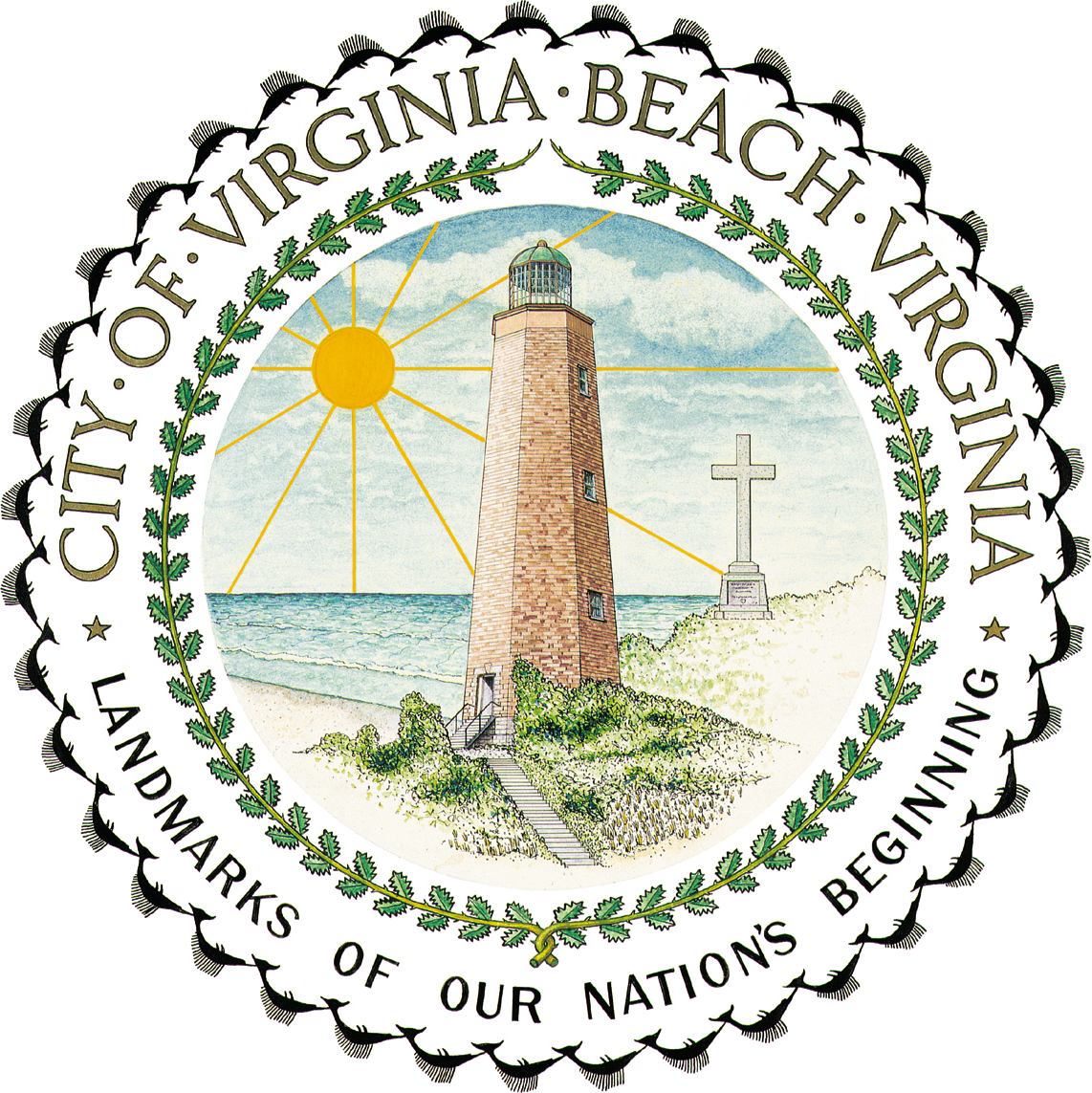
- Flag Seal Logo
- Nicknames: "The Resort City", VA Beach
- Motto: Landmarks of Our Nation's Beginning
- Interactive map of Virginia Beach
- Location within Virginia Location within the United States
- Coordinates: 36°51′00″N 75°58′40″W
- Country: United States
- State: Virginia
- Incorporated (town): 1906
- Incorporated (city): 1952

Government
  - Type: Mayor–council–manager
  - Body: Virginia Beach City Council
  - Mayor: Bobby Dyer (R)

Area
  - Independent city: 497.50 sq mi (1,288.52 km^{2})
  - Land: 244.72 sq mi (633.83 km^{2})
  - Water: 252.78 sq mi (654.69 km^{2})
- Elevation: 10 ft (3.0 m)

Population (2020)
  - Independent city: 459,470
  - Estimate (2025): 453,737 ▼
  - Rank: US: 43rd VA: 1st
  - Density: 1,877.53/sq mi (724.92/km^{2})
  - Urban: 1,451,578 (US: 36th)
  - Urban density: 3,014/sq mi (1,163.6/km^{2})
  - Metro: 1,799,674 (US: 37th)

GDP
  - Independent city: $29.532 billion (2023)
  - Metro: $127.459 billion (2023)
- Time zone: UTC−05:00 (EST)
  - Summer (DST): UTC−04:00 (EDT)
- ZIP Codes: 23450-23467, 23471, 23479
- Area codes: 757, 948
- FIPS code: 51-82000
- GNIS feature ID: 1500261
- Website: virginiabeach.gov

Virginia Beach (colloquially VB) is the most populous city in the U.S. commonwealth of Virginia. The city is located on the Atlantic Ocean at the mouth of the Chesapeake Bay in southeastern Virginia. It is the sixth-most populous city in the Mid-Atlantic and the Northeast, ninth-most populous in the Southeast, and the 43rd-most populous city in the U.S. with a population of 459,470 at the 2020 census. Virginia Beach is a principal city in the Hampton Roads metropolitan area, which has more than 1.8 million inhabitants and is the 37th-largest metropolitan area in the U.S.

Virginia Beach is a resort city with miles of beaches and hundreds of hotels, motels, and restaurants along its oceanfront. Near the point where the Chesapeake Bay and the Atlantic Ocean meet, Cape Henry was the site of the first landing of the English colonists who eventually settled in Jamestown; modern Virginia Beach was established in 1906. It is home to several state parks, protected beaches, and military bases. Batten University, Regent University, Christian Broadcasting Network, the U.S. headquarters of Stihl, and the Association for Research and Enlightenment are based in Virginia Beach. It also hosts the annual East Coast Surfing Championships and Neptune Festival.

The city is listed in the Guinness Book of Records as having the longest pleasure beach in the world. It is located at the southern end of the Chesapeake Bay Bridge–Tunnel, which was the world's longest bridge–tunnel complex until the Hong Kong–Zhuhai–Macau Bridge opened in 2018.

As of 2020, the city was the most representative locality of the state's income, race, and level of educational attainment.

== History ==
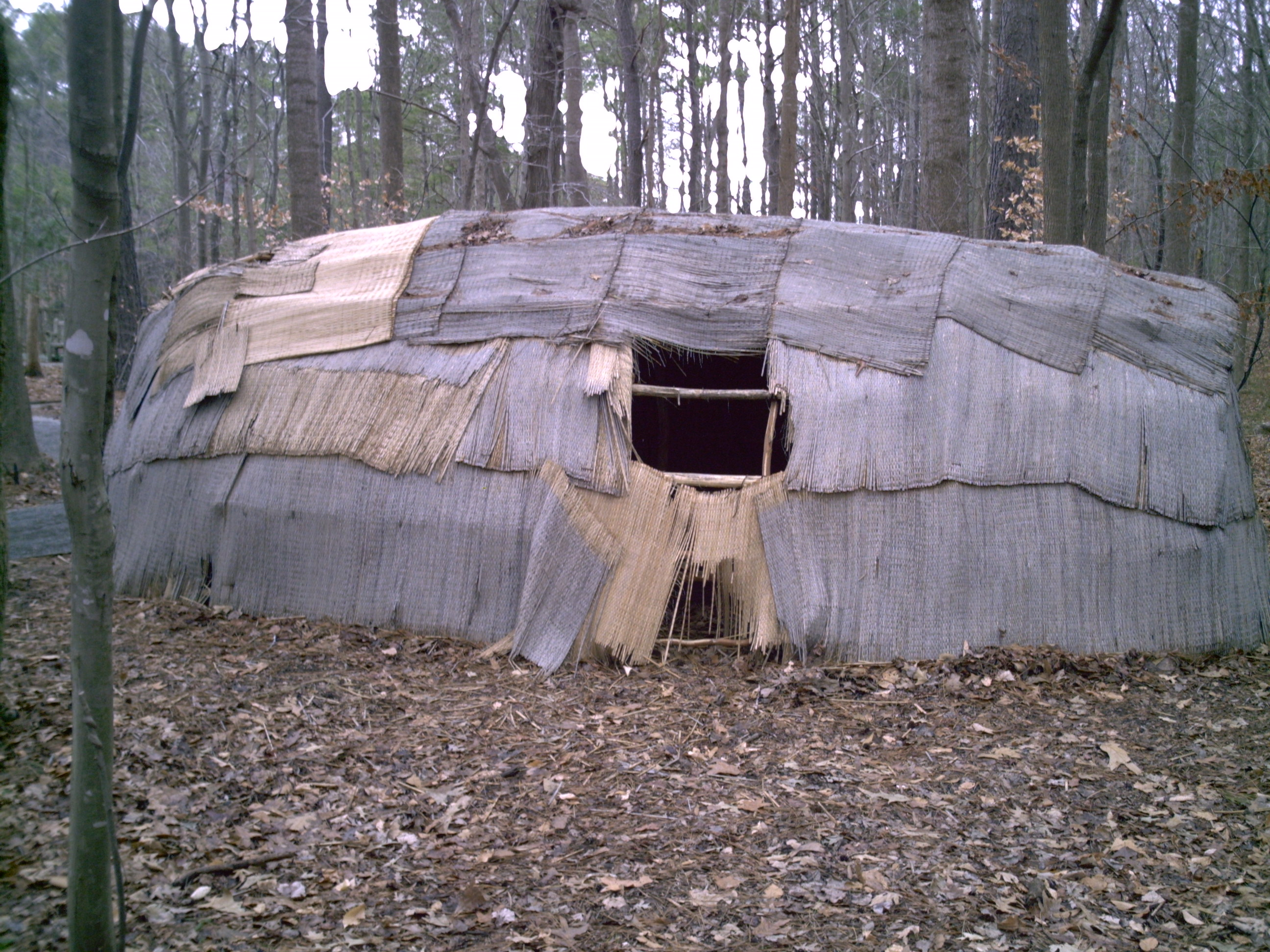
A Chesepian home

The Chesepian were the historic indigenous people of the area now known as Tidewater in Virginia at the time of European encounter. Little is known about them but archeological evidence suggests they may have been related to the Carolina Algonquian, or Pamlico people. They would have spoken one of the Algonquian languages. These were common among the numerous tribes of the coastal area, who made up the loose Powhatan Confederacy, numbering in the tens of thousands in population. The Chesepian occupied an area which is now defined as the independent cities of Norfolk, Portsmouth, Chesapeake, and Virginia Beach.

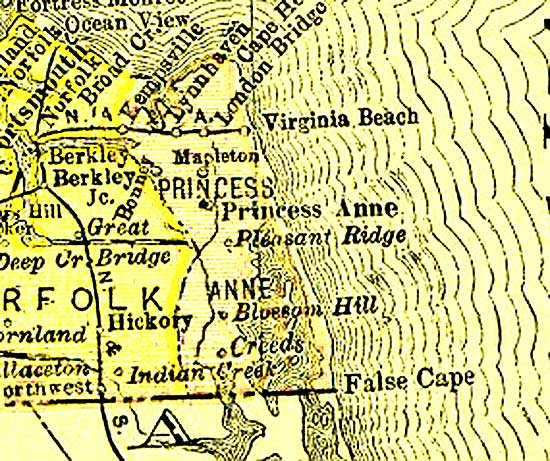
Princess Anne County (1691–1963), now defunct, with Virginia Beach from 1895 Virginia map

In 1607, after a voyage of 144 days, three ships headed by Captain Christopher Newport, and carrying 105 men and boys, made their first landfall in the New World on the mainland, where the southern mouth of the Chesapeake Bay meets the Atlantic Ocean. They named it Cape Henry, after Henry Frederick, Prince of Wales, the eldest son of King James I of England. These English colonists of the Virginia Company of London moved on from this area, as they were under orders to seek a site further inland, which would be more sheltered from ships of competing European countries. They created their first permanent settlement on the north side of the James River at Jamestown.

Adam Thoroughgood (1604–1640) of King's Lynn, Norfolk, England is one of the earliest Englishmen to settle in this area, which was developed as Virginia Beach. At the age of 18, he had contracted as an indentured servant to pay for passage to the Virginia Colony in the hopes of bettering his life. He earned his freedom after several years and became a leading citizen of the area. In 1629, he was elected to the House of Burgesses for Elizabeth Cittie [sic], one of four "cities" (or incorporations) which were subdivided areas established in 1619.

In 1634, the Colony was divided into the original eight shires of Virginia, soon renamed as counties. Thoroughgood is credited with using the name of his home in England when helping name "New Norfolk County" in 1637. The following year, New Norfolk County was split into Upper Norfolk County (soon renamed Nansemond County) and Lower Norfolk County. Thoroughgood resided after 1634 was along the Lynnhaven River, named for his home in England.

Lower Norfolk County was large when first organized, defined as from the Atlantic Ocean west past the Elizabeth River, encompassing the entire area now within the modern cities of Portsmouth, Norfolk, Chesapeake, and Virginia Beach. It attracted many entrepreneurs, including William Moseley with his family in 1648. Belonging to the Merchant Adventurers Guild of London, he immigrated from Rotterdam of the Netherlands, where he had been in international trade. He settled on land on the north side of the Elizabeth River, east of what developed as Norfolk.

Following the increased settlement, in 1691 Lower Norfolk County was divided to form Norfolk and Princess Anne counties. Princess Anne, the easternmost county in South Hampton Roads, extended from Cape Henry at the mouth of the Chesapeake Bay, south to what became the border of the North Carolina colony. It included all of the area fronting the Atlantic Ocean. Princess Anne County was known as a jurisdiction from 1691 to 1963, over 250 years.

In the early centuries, this area was rural and developed for plantation agriculture. In the late 19th century, the small resort area of Virginia Beach developed in Princess Anne County after the 1883 arrival of rail service to the coast. The Virginia Beach Hotel was opened and operated by the Norfolk and Virginia Beach Railroad and Improvement Company at the oceanfront, near the tiny community of Seatack. The hotel was foreclosed and the railroad was reorganized in 1887. The hotel was upgraded and reopened in 1888 as the Princess Anne Hotel.

In 1891, guests at the new hotel watched the wreck and rescue efforts of the United States Life-Saving Service for the Norwegian barque Dictator. The ship's figurehead, which washed up on the beach several days later, was erected as a monument to the victims and rescuers. It stood along the oceanfront for more than 50 years. In the 21st century, it inspired the pair of matching Norwegian Lady Monuments, sculpted by Ørnulf Bast and installed in Virginia Beach and Moss, Norway.

The resort initially depended on railroad and electric trolley service. The completion of Virginia Beach Boulevard in 1922, which extended from Norfolk to the oceanfront, opened the route for automobiles, buses, and trucks. The passenger rail service to the oceanfront was eventually discontinued as traffic increased by vehicles. The growing resort of Virginia Beach became an incorporated town in 1906. Over the next 45 years, Virginia Beach continued to grow in popularity as a seasonal vacation spot. The casinos were replaced by amusement parks and family-oriented attractions. In 1927 The Cavalier Hotel opened and became a popular vacation spot.

Virginia Beach was incorporated as a city in 1952. Per Virginia law, it separated from Princess Anne County, though the county and the city continued to have very close ties. In 1963, after voters in the two jurisdictions passed a supporting referendum, and with the approval of the Virginia General Assembly, the two political subdivisions merged into new, much larger independent city, retaining the better-known name of the Virginia Beach resort.

The Alan B. Shepard Civic Center ("The Dome"), a significant building in the city's history because of the many famous musical acts played there, was constructed in 1958, and was dedicated to the career of former Virginia Beach resident and astronaut Alan Shepard. As the area changed, the Dome was frequently used as a bingo hall. The building was razed in 1994 to make room for a municipal parking lot and potential future development. Since then, the Dome has been rebuilt, reopening in 2025, and it continues to serve as an entertainment venue.

=== Recent history ===
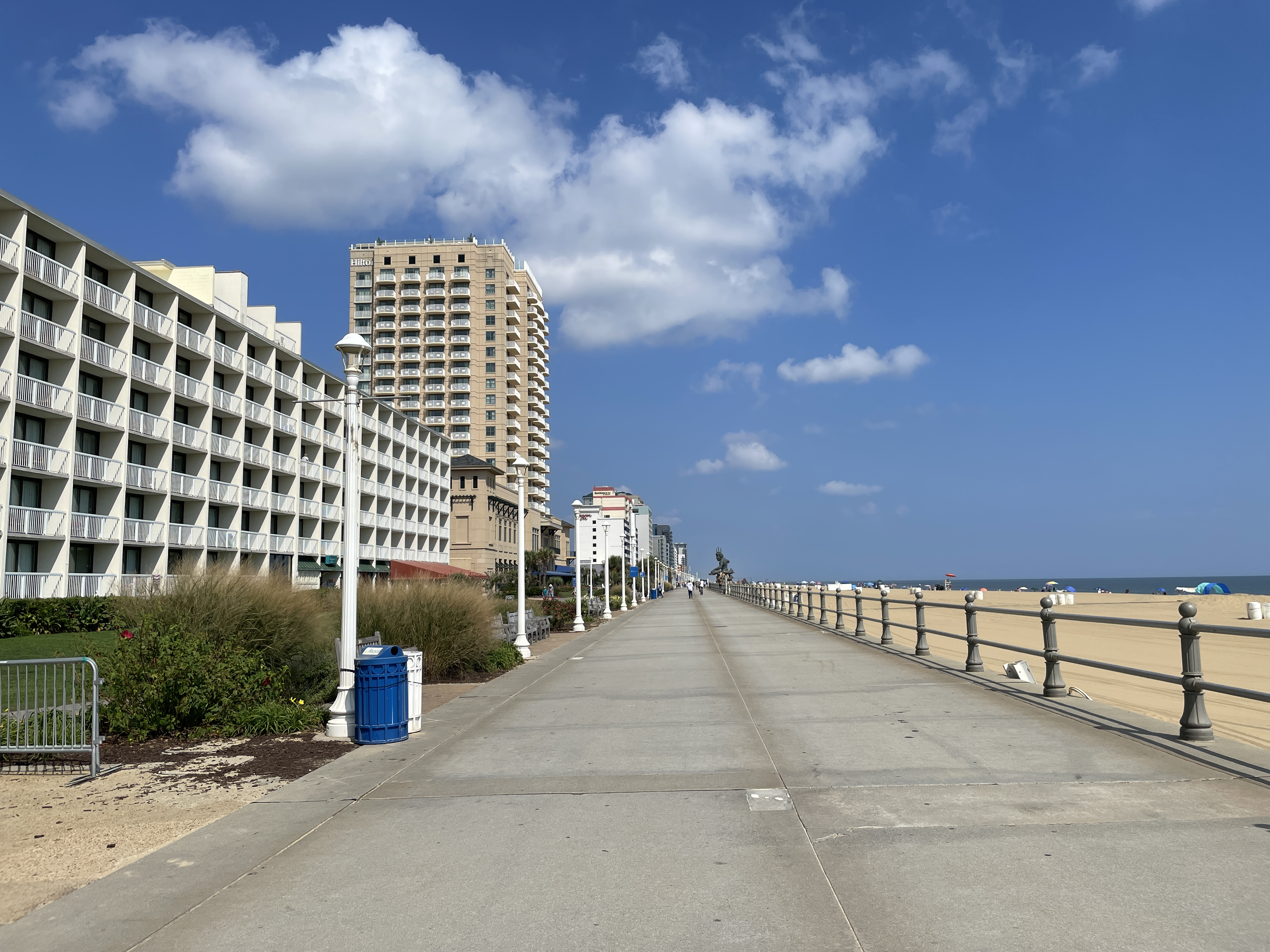
Boardwalk in Virginia Beach

Real estate, defense, and tourism are major sectors of the Virginia Beach economy. Many local public and private groups have maintained a vested interest in real-estate redevelopment, resulting in a number of joint public-private projects, such as commercial parks. Examples of the public-private development include the Virginia Beach Convention Center, the Oceanfront Hilton Hotel, and the Virginia Beach Town Center. The city assisted in financing the project through the use of tax increment financing: creating special tax districts and constructing associated street and infrastructure to support the developments. The Town Center opened in 2003, with related construction continuing. The Convention Center opened in 2005.

The city has begun to run out of clear land available for new construction north of the Green Line, an urban growth boundary dividing the urban northern and rural southern sections of the city. Infill and development of residential neighborhoods has placed a number of operating constraints on Naval Air Station Oceana, a major fighter jet base for the U.S. Navy. While the airbase enjoys wide support from Virginia Beach at large, the Pentagon Base Realignment and Closure commission has proposed closure of Oceana by 2018 but this did not happen. In 2012 a Navy jet that took off from Oceana experienced engine failure and crashed into an apartment complex.

This land crunch led to floodplain development. During Hurricane Matthew, the heavy rainfall flooded over 2000 homes and left some neighborhoods with standing water for days. Given the rising risks of flooding due to climate change and the impetus of the hurricane damage, the city rejected several further development proposals. This rejection was significant from two perspectives. First, cities reject building very rarely, demonstrating the shift in public perception. Second, these rejections led to lawsuits by the developers. The rejection of these lawsuits in the courts provides precedent for other sorts of local climate change adaptation efforts in the future. Discussing the matter, Mayor Dyer noted, "It's a confrontation with reality. Not everybody's going to be happy."

On May 31, 2019, a shooting occurred at a municipal government building in Virginia Beach. A former employee entered the building and shot indiscriminately, killing 12 people and injuring four others before dying from a gunshot wound fired by responding officers. It’s the second deadliest mass shooting in Virginia history, behind only the 2007 Virginia Tech Massacre.

== Geography ==
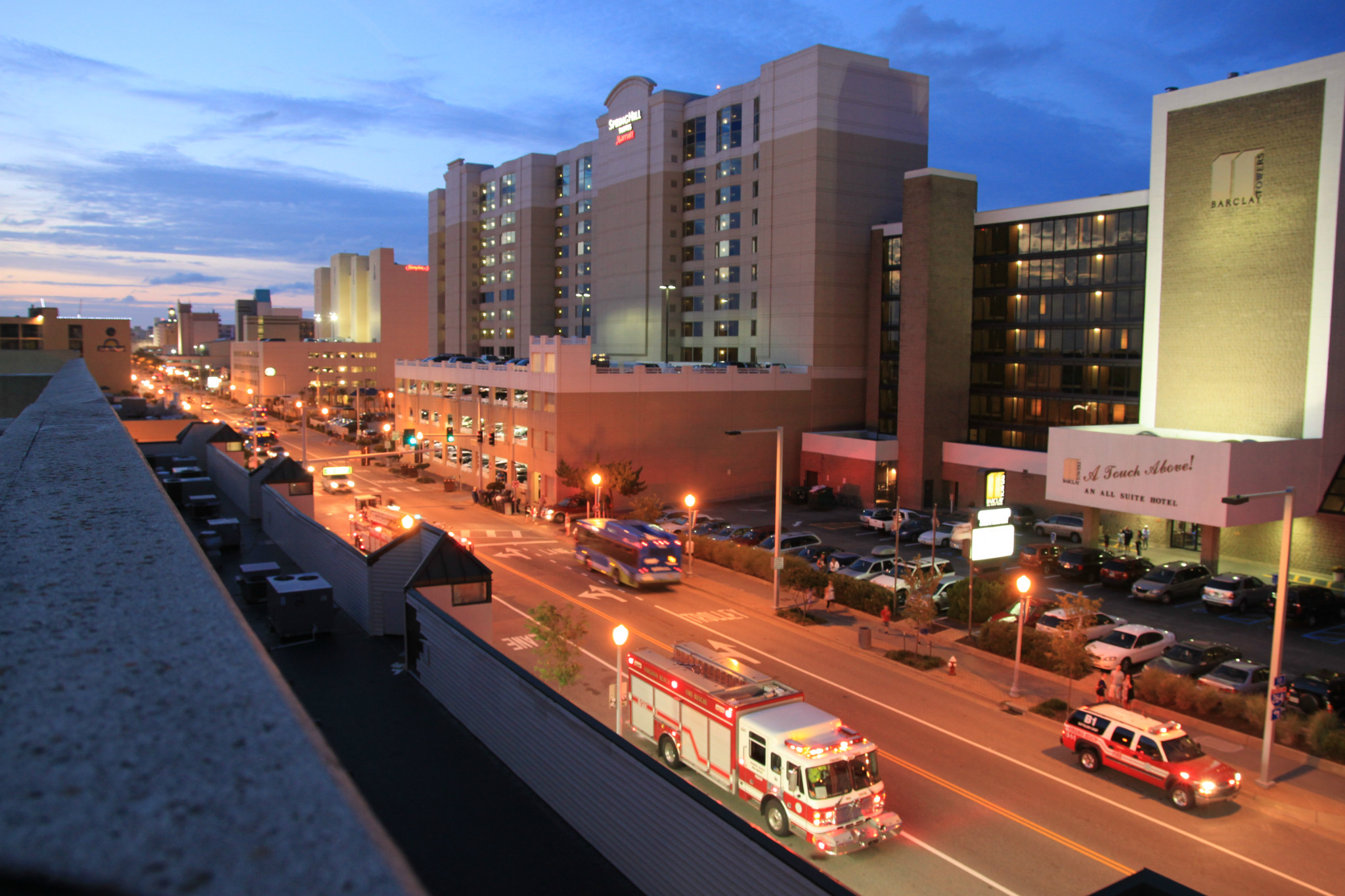
Hotels along Atlantic Avenue, facing north

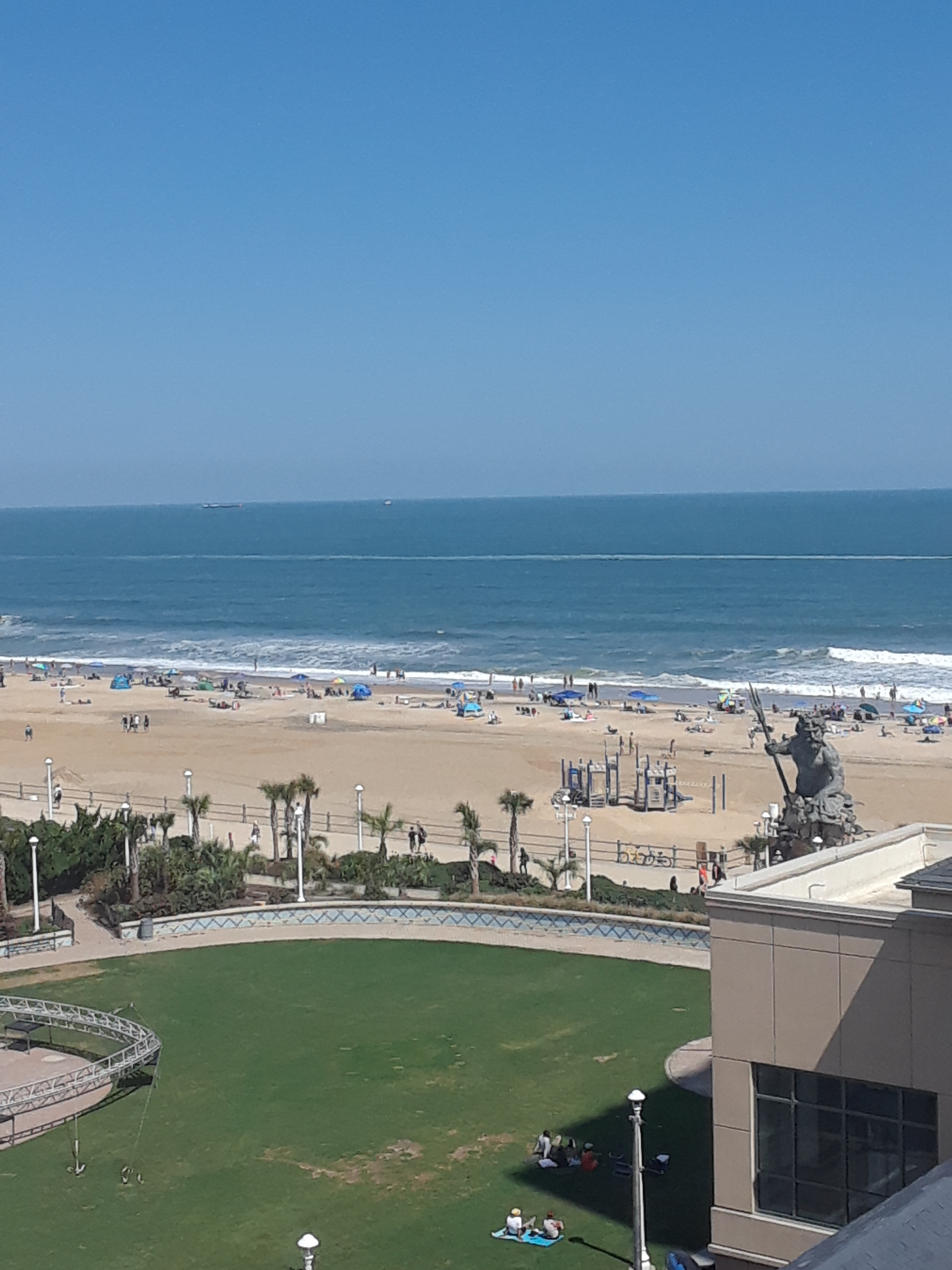
Overlooking the Atlantic Ocean

Virginia Beach is located at 36.8506°N 75.9779°W.

According to the United States Census Bureau, the city has a total area of 497.5 square miles (1,289 km^{2}), of which 244.72 square miles (633.8 km^{2}) is land and 252.78 square miles (654.7 km^{2}) (50.8%) is water. It is the largest city in Virginia by total area and third-largest city by land area, and by far the largest by water area. The average elevation is 12 feet (3.7 m) above sea level. A major portion of the city drains to the Chesapeake Bay by way of the Lynnhaven River and its tributaries.

The city is located at the southeastern corner of Virginia in the Hampton Roads area bordering the Atlantic Ocean. The Hampton Roads metropolitan area (officially the Virginia Beach–Norfolk–Newport News, VA–NC Metropolitan Statistical Area) is the 37th largest in the United States, with a total population of 1.7 million. While Virginia Beach is the most populated city within the metropolitan area, it functions as a suburb.

Virginia Beach is 19 miles (31 km) east of Norfolk, Virginia, 24 miles (39 km) northeast of Chesapeake, Virginia, 208 miles (335 km) south of Washington, D.C., 107 miles (172 km) southeast of Richmond, Virginia, and 200 miles (320 km) northeast of Raleigh, North Carolina.

=== Neighborhoods ===
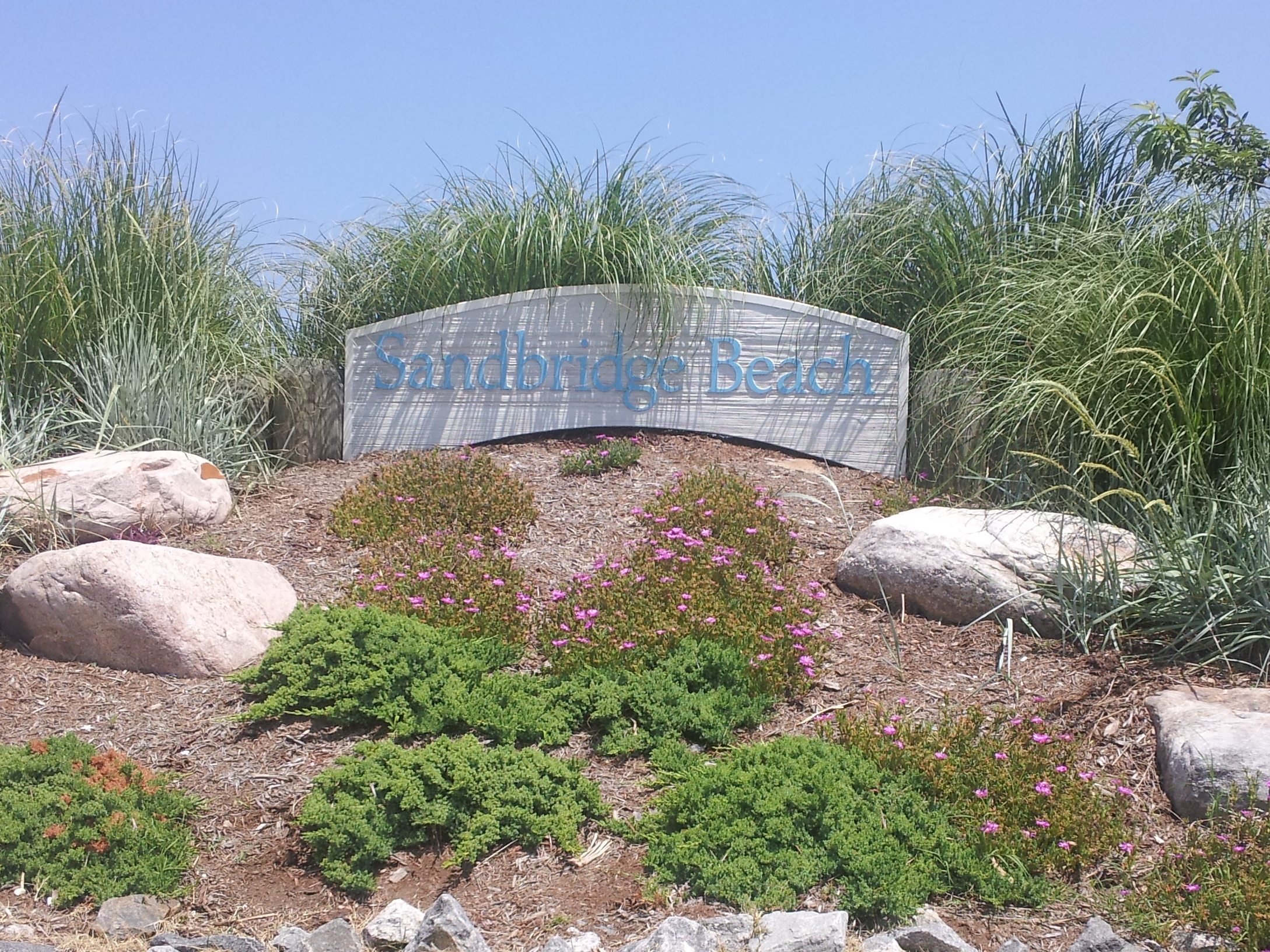
Sandbridge

When the modern city of Virginia Beach was created in 1963, by the consolidation of the 253 square miles (660 km^{2}) Princess Anne County with the 2 square miles (5.2 km^{2}) City of Virginia Beach, the newly larger city was divided into seven boroughs: Bayside, Blackwater, Kempsville, Lynnhaven, Princess Anne, Pungo, and Virginia Beach.

Virginia Beach has many distinctive communities and neighborhoods within its boundaries, including: Alanton, Aragona Village, the largest sub-division in Tidewater when completed, Bay Colony, Bayside, Cape Henry, Chesapeake Beach, Croatan Beach, Great Neck Point, Green Run, Kempsville, Larkspur, London Bridge, Lynnhaven, Newtown, The North End, Oceana, Ocean Park, Pembroke Manor, Princess Anne, Pungo, Red Mill Commons, Sandbridge, Shadowlawn, Thalia, and Thoroughgood.

=== Climate ===
Virginia Beach, VA

Climate chart (precipitation, max. and min. temperature)
J	F	M	A	M	J	J	A	S	O	N	D
3.6 49 30	3.5 52 32	4.1 60 38	3.5 69 47	3.8 77 56	4 85 65	5.1 88 69	5.2 86 68	4.7 81 61	3.5 71 50	3.3 62 41	3.6 53 33
- █ Average max. and min. temperatures in °F
- █ Precipitation totals in inches
Metric conversion
J	F	M	A	M	J	J	A	S	O	N	D
91 9 −1	89 11 0	104 15 3	89 21 8	97 25 13	102 29 18	130 31 21	132 30 20	119 27 16	89 22 10	84 17 5	91 11 1
- █ Average max. and min. temperatures in °C
- █ Precipitation totals in mm

The climate of Virginia Beach is humid subtropical (Köppen: Cfa). For the Trewartha climate classification the climate is the northern limit of Cf (subtropical).

Much of the year in Virginia Beach is mild to warm. The long summer season from late May through late September is often hot and humid, with frequent (but brief) late day thundershowers. Winters are cool with little frozen precipitation, and snowfall is light. The official weather statistics are recorded at Norfolk International Airport on the extreme northwestern border of Virginia Beach. The mean annual temperature is 59.6 °F (15.3 °C), with an average annual snowfall of 5.8 inches (150 mm) at the airport to around 3.0 inches (76 mm) in the southeastern corner around Back Bay. Average annual precipitation (the large majority rainfall) is high, ranging between 47 inches (1,200 mm) at the airport to over 50 inches (1,300 mm) per year at Back Bay. The wettest season is summer, specifically July to early September, with August the single wettest month, averaging over 5.5 inches (140 mm) of rain. From October to June, average monthly precipitation is remarkably consistent, ranging between 3.1 and 3.7 inches (79 and 94 mm). Virginia Beach averages 2200 hours of sunshine annually, higher than the USA average.

The highest recorded temperature to date was 105 °F (41 °C) in July 2010, and the lowest recorded temperature was −3 °F (−19 °C) in January 1985, both being recorded at Norfolk International Airport. The coldest daily maximum on record was 12 °F (−11 °C) in December 1917, whereas the 1991–2020 normals had a coldest maximum average of 29 °F (−2 °C). This means that in spite of the mild normals, most years record at least one ice day, with rare exceptions. Summer nights are sometimes really hot. The all-time record warmest low temperature is 84 °F (29 °C) from July 1942, while a normal year's warmest night averages 80 °F (27 °C).

Additionally, the geographic location of the city, with respect to the principal storm tracks, is especially favorable which is why it has earned the reputation as a vacation destination. It is south of the average path of storms originating in the higher latitudes, and north of the usual tracks of hurricanes and other major tropical storms, with the exception of Hurricane Isabel in 2003. Because of the moderating effects of the Chesapeake Bay and the Atlantic Ocean, Virginia Beach is the northernmost location on the east coast in which many species of plants (both subtropical and tropical) will reliably grow. Spanish moss, for example is near the northernmost limit of its natural range at First Landing State Park, and is the most northerly location where it is widespread. Other plants like the Windmill Palm, Sabal palmetto, Butia odorata (in protected locations), and Oleander are successfully grown here while they succumb to the colder winter temperatures to the north and inland to the west. The hardiness zone is 8b along the coast and in Urban areas, and 8a inland and to the northwest.

On April 30, 2023, an EF-3 tornado struck the Great Neck neighborhood in the northeastern section of the city. It was on the ground five minutes, and there were no injuries. It is the strongest tornado on record to hit the city.

Climate data for Norfolk International Airport, Virginia (1991–2020 normals, (Note: Mean monthly maxima and minima (i.e. the expected highest and lowest temperature readings at any point during the year or given month) calculated based on data at said location from 1991 to 2020.) extremes 1874–present (Note: Official records for Norfolk kept January 1874 to December 1945 at the Weather Bureau Office in downtown, and at Norfolk Int'l since January 1946. For more information, see Threadex.))
Month	Jan	Feb	Mar	Apr	May	Jun	Jul	Aug	Sep	Oct	Nov	Dec	Year
Record high °F (°C)	84 (29)	82 (28)	92 (33)	97 (36)	100 (38)	102 (39)	105 (41)	105 (41)	100 (38)	95 (35)	86 (30)	82 (28)	105 (41)
Mean maximum °F (°C)	72.4 (22.4)	74.3 (23.5)	80.7 (27.1)	86.9 (30.5)	91.5 (33.1)	95.7 (35.4)	98.4 (36.9)	95.3 (35.2)	92.0 (33.3)	86.0 (30.0)	78.9 (26.1)	73.4 (23.0)	99.3 (37.4)
Mean daily maximum °F (°C)	50.7 (10.4)	53.4 (11.9)	60.1 (15.6)	70.0 (21.1)	77.4 (25.2)	85.2 (29.6)	89.4 (31.9)	86.9 (30.5)	81.4 (27.4)	72.3 (22.4)	62.1 (16.7)	54.7 (12.6)	70.3 (21.3)
Daily mean °F (°C)	42.2 (5.7)	44.2 (6.8)	50.7 (10.4)	60.1 (15.6)	68.3 (20.2)	76.7 (24.8)	81.1 (27.3)	79.2 (26.2)	74.0 (23.3)	63.7 (17.6)	53.3 (11.8)	46.1 (7.8)	61.6 (16.4)
Mean daily minimum °F (°C)	33.6 (0.9)	35.1 (1.7)	41.3 (5.2)	50.1 (10.1)	59.1 (15.1)	68.1 (20.1)	72.8 (22.7)	71.6 (22.0)	66.6 (19.2)	55.1 (12.8)	44.4 (6.9)	37.6 (3.1)	52.9 (11.6)
Mean minimum °F (°C)	18.7 (−7.4)	21.6 (−5.8)	27.4 (−2.6)	37.0 (2.8)	46.9 (8.3)	56.0 (13.3)	64.7 (18.2)	63.7 (17.6)	55.5 (13.1)	40.4 (4.7)	29.8 (−1.2)	23.9 (−4.5)	16.8 (−8.4)
Record low °F (°C)	−3 (−19)	2 (−17)	14 (−10)	23 (−5)	36 (2)	45 (7)	54 (12)	49 (9)	40 (4)	27 (−3)	17 (−8)	5 (−15)	−3 (−19)
Average precipitation inches (mm)	3.41 (87)	2.90 (74)	3.69 (94)	3.37 (86)	3.78 (96)	4.43 (113)	6.08 (154)	5.88 (149)	5.40 (137)	3.86 (98)	3.10 (79)	3.28 (83)	49.18 (1,249)
Average snowfall inches (cm)	3.2 (8.1)	1.5 (3.8)	0.4 (1.0)	0.0 (0.0)	0.0 (0.0)	0.0 (0.0)	0.0 (0.0)	0.0 (0.0)	0.0 (0.0)	0.0 (0.0)	0.0 (0.0)	1.1 (2.8)	6.2 (16)
Average precipitation days (≥ 0.01 in)	10.7	9.2	10.9	10.0	11.2	9.7	10.6	10.2	9.4	7.7	8.9	9.9	118.4
Average snowy days (≥ 0.1 in)	1.7	1.3	0.5	0.0	0.0	0.0	0.0	0.0	0.0	0.0	0.0	0.5	4.0
Average relative humidity (%)	66.3	65.6	64.6	62.8	68.8	70.6	73.3	75.2	74.4	72.1	68.5	67.0	69.1
Average dew point °F (°C)	27.9 (−2.3)	28.9 (−1.7)	35.8 (2.1)	43.2 (6.2)	54.5 (12.5)	63.1 (17.3)	68.2 (20.1)	68.0 (20.0)	62.4 (16.9)	51.3 (10.7)	41.7 (5.4)	32.7 (0.4)	48.1 (9.0)
Mean monthly sunshine hours	171.5	175.2	229.3	252.8	271.7	280.1	278.3	260.4	231.4	208.3	175.7	160.4	2,695.1
Percentage possible sunshine	56	58	62	64	62	64	62	62	62	60	57	53	61
Average ultraviolet index	2	4	5	7	8	10	9	9	7	5	3	2	6
Source 1: NOAA (relative humidity and sun 1961–1990)
Source 2: Weather Atlas (UV)

== Demographics ==
Historical population
Census	Pop.	Note	%±
1910	320		—
1920	846		164.4%
1930	1,719		103.2%
1940	2,600		51.3%
1950	5,390		107.3%
1960	8,091		50.1%
1970	172,106		2,027.1%
1980	262,199		52.3%
1990	393,069		49.9%
2000	425,257		8.2%
2010	437,994		3.0%
2020	459,470		4.9%
2025 (est.)	453,737	▼	−1.2%
U.S. Decennial Census; 1790–1960 1900–1990; 1990–2000 2010–2020

=== Racial and ethnic composition ===
Virginia Beach city, Virginia – Racial and ethnic composition Note: the US Census treats Hispanic/Latino as an ethnic category. This table excludes Latinos from the racial categories and assigns them to a separate category. Hispanics/Latinos may be of any race.
Race / Ethnicity (NH = Non-Hispanic)	Pop 1980	Pop 1990	Pop 2000	Pop 2010	Pop 2020	% 1980	% 1990	% 2000	% 2010	% 2020
White alone (NH)	223,860	309,712	295,402	282,470	269,566	85.38%	78.79%	69.46%	64.49%	58.67%
Black or African American alone (NH)	25,966	53,720	79,092	83,210	82,583	9.90%	13.67%	18.60%	19.00%	17.97%
Native American or Alaska Native alone (NH)	633	1,275	1,448	1,349	1,184	0.24%	0.32%	0.34%	0.31%	0.26%
Asian alone (NH)	6,570	15,920	20,618	26,312	33,756	2.51%	4.05%	4.85%	6.01%	7.35%
Native Hawaiian or Pacific Islander alone (NH)	x	x	356	602	671	x	x	0.08%	0.14%	0.15%
Other race alone (NH)	10	305	913	863	2,599	0.00%	0.08%	0.21%	0.20%	0.57%
Mixed race or Multiracial (NH)	x	x	9,658	14,201	28,707	x	x	2.27%	3.24%	6.25%
Hispanic or Latino (any race)	5,160	12,137	17,770	28,987	40,404	1.97%	3.09%	4.18%	6.62%	8.79%
Total	262,199	393,069	425,257	437,994	459,470	100.00%	100.00%	100.00%	100.00%	100.00%

=== 2020 census ===
As of the 2020 census, Virginia Beach had a population of 459,470. The median age was 37.1 years. 22.1% of residents were under the age of 18 and 15.1% of residents were 65 years of age or older. For every 100 females there were 95.2 males, and for every 100 females age 18 and over there were 92.7 males age 18 and over. 98.2% of residents lived in urban areas, while 1.8% lived in rural areas. There were 178,353 households in Virginia Beach, of which 31.7% had children under the age of 18 living in them. Of all households, 48.3% were married-couple households, 17.3% were households with a male householder and no spouse or partner present, and 27.9% were households with a female householder and no spouse or partner present. About 25.4% of all households were made up of individuals and 9.3% had someone living alone who was 65 years of age or older. There were 190,059 housing units, of which 6.2% were vacant. The homeowner vacancy rate was 1.2% and the rental vacancy rate was 4.9%.

=== 2022 American Community Survey ===
As of the 2022 American Community Survey estimates, there were 455,618 people and 179,752 households. The population density was 1,861.8 inhabitants per square mile (718.8/km^{2}). There were 191,169 housing units at an average density of 781.2 per square mile (301.6/km^{2}). The racial makeup of the city was 60.3% White, 18.8% Black or African American, 7.2% Asian, 2.9% some other race, 0.3% Native Hawaiian or Other Pacific Islander, and 0.3% Native American or Alaskan Native, with 10.3% from two or more races. Hispanics or Latinos of any race were 9.0% of the population.

Of the 179,752 households, 30.0% had children under the age of 18 living with them, 29.2% had seniors 65 years or older living with them, 46.8% were married couples living together, 7.1% were couples cohabitating, 18.0% had a male householder with no partner present, and 28.1% had a female householder with no partner present. The median household size was 2.49 and the median family size was 3.08.

The age distribution was 21.7% under 18, 8.7% from 18 to 24, 29.6% from 25 to 44, 24.0% from 45 to 64, and 16.1% who were 65 or older. The median age was 37.8 years.

The median income for a household was $83,245, with family households having a median income of $103,451 and non-family households $54,258. The per capita income was $44,287. Out of the 447,930 people with a determined poverty status, 10.0% were below the poverty line. Further, 14.4% of minors and 8.8% of seniors were below the poverty line.

In the survey, residents self-identified with various ethnic ancestries. People of English descent made up 11.7% of the population of the town, followed by German at 10.6%, Irish at 9.6%, American at 6.8%, Italian at 5.1%, Sub-Saharan African at 2.4%, Polish at 2.3%, French at 1.9%, Scottish at 1.9%, Scotch-Irish at 0.9%, Caribbean (excluding Hispanics) at 0.8%, Dutch at 0.7%, Swedish at 0.6%, Norwegian at 0.6%, Welsh at 0.5%, Czech at 0.5%, Ukrainian at 0.5%, and Greek at 0.5%.

=== 2010 census ===
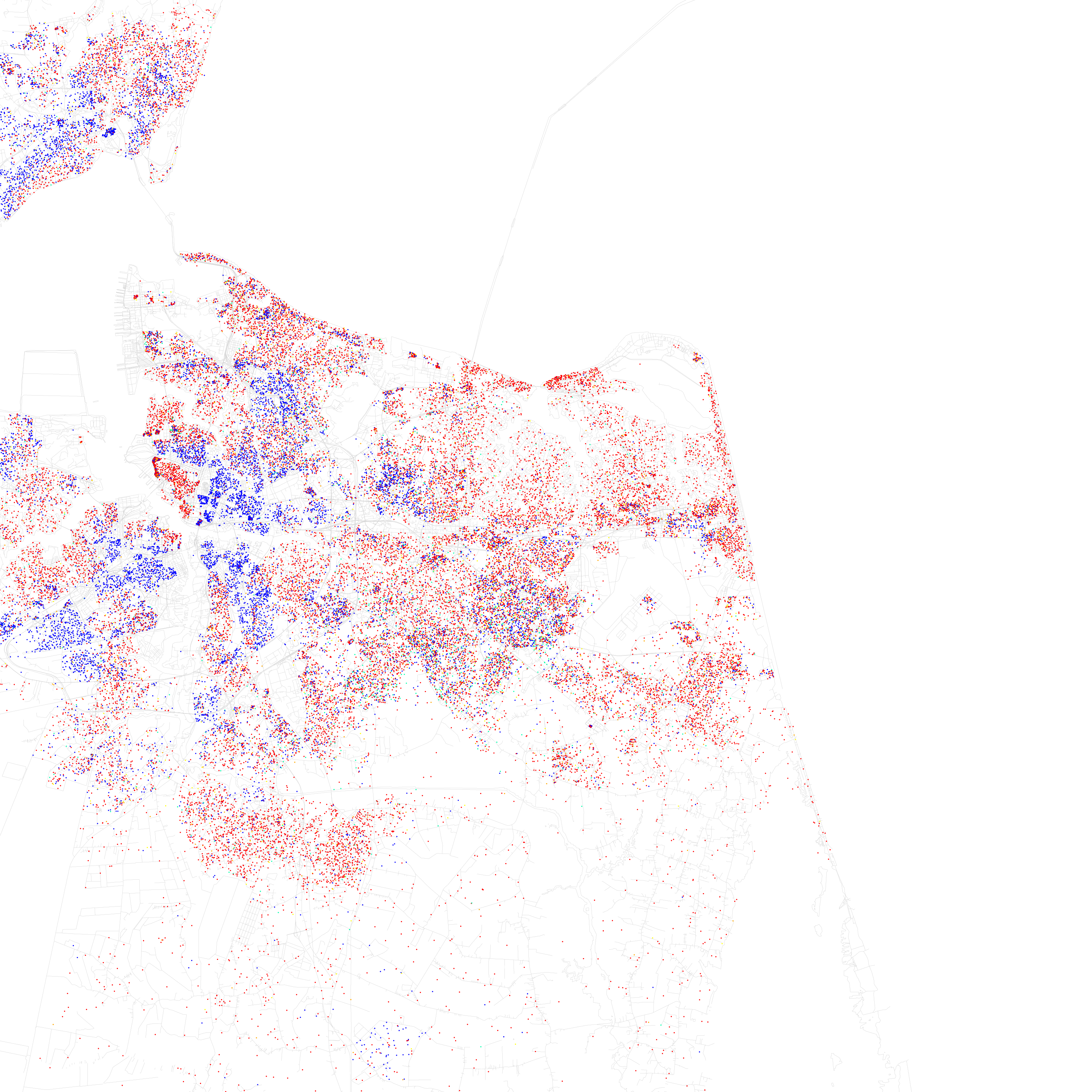
Map of racial distribution in Virginia Beach, 2010 U.S. Census. Each dot is 25 people: ⬤ White ⬤ Black ⬤ Asian ⬤ Hispanic ⬤ Other

According to the 2010 Census, the racial composition of Virginia Beach was as follows:

- White or Caucasian: 67.7% (Non-Hispanic White: 64.5%)
- Black or African American: 19.6%
- Native American: 0.4%
- Asian: 6.1% (4.0% Filipino, 0.5% Chinese, 0.4% Indian, 0.4% Vietnamese, 0.3% Korean, 0.2% Japanese)
- Native Hawaiian and Other Pacific Islander: 0.1%
- Some other race: 2.0%
- Two or more races: 4.0%
- Hispanic or Latino (of any race): 6.6% (2.2% Puerto Rican, 1.9% Mexican, 0.3% Dominican, 0.2% Panamanian, 0.2% Salvadoran, 0.2% Cuban, 0.2% Colombian)

As of the 2000 Census, there were 425,257 people, 154,455 households, and 110,898 families residing in the city. The population density was 1,712.7 inhabitants per square mile (661.3/km^{2}). There were 162,277 housing units at an average density of 653.6 units per square mile (252.4 units/km^{2}).

There were 154,455 households, out of which 38.8% had children under the age of 18 living with them, 55.7% were married couples living together, 12.4% had a female householder with no husband present, and 28.2% were non-families. 20.4% of all households were made up of individuals, and 5.5% had someone living alone who was 65 years of age or older. The average household size was 2.70 and the average family size was 3.14.

The age distribution was 27.5% under the age of 18, 10.0% from 18 to 24, 34.3% from 25 to 44, 19.8% from 45 to 64, and 8.4% who were 65 years of age or older. The median age was 33 years. For every 100 females, there were 98.0 males. For every 100 females aged 18 and over, there were 95.8 males.

The median income for a household in the city was $48,705, and the median income for a family was $53,242. Virginia Beach had the 5th highest median family income among large cities in 2003. The per capita income for the city was $22,365. About 5.1% of families and 8.2% of the population were below the poverty line, including 8.6% of those under age 18 and 4.7% of those age 65 or over.

7.1% of the people under the age of 65 years are disabled while 8.6% people don't have health insurance.

The city of Virginia Beach has a lower crime rate than the other regional cities of Hampton Roads, Newport News, Norfolk, and Portsmouth, which all exceed national average crime rates. In 1999 Virginia Beach experienced 12 murders giving the city a murder rate of 2.7 per 100,000 people. For 2007, Virginia Beach had 16 murders, for a murder rate of 3.7 per 100,000 people. That was lower than the national average that year of 6.9. The city's total crime index rate for 2007 was 221.2 per 100,000 people, lower than the national average of 320.9. According to the Congressional Quarterly Press '2008 City Crime Rankings: Crime in Metropolitan America, Virginia Beach, Virginia ranks 311th in violent crime among 385 cities containing more than 75,000 inhabitants.

Violent crimes per 100,000 citizens
Crime	Virginia Beach (2009)	National Average
Murder	3.7	6.9
Rape	20.2	32.2
Robbery	127.3	195.4
Assault	98.6	340.1
Burglary	495.2	814.5
Automobile Theft	134.4	526.5

=== Religion ===
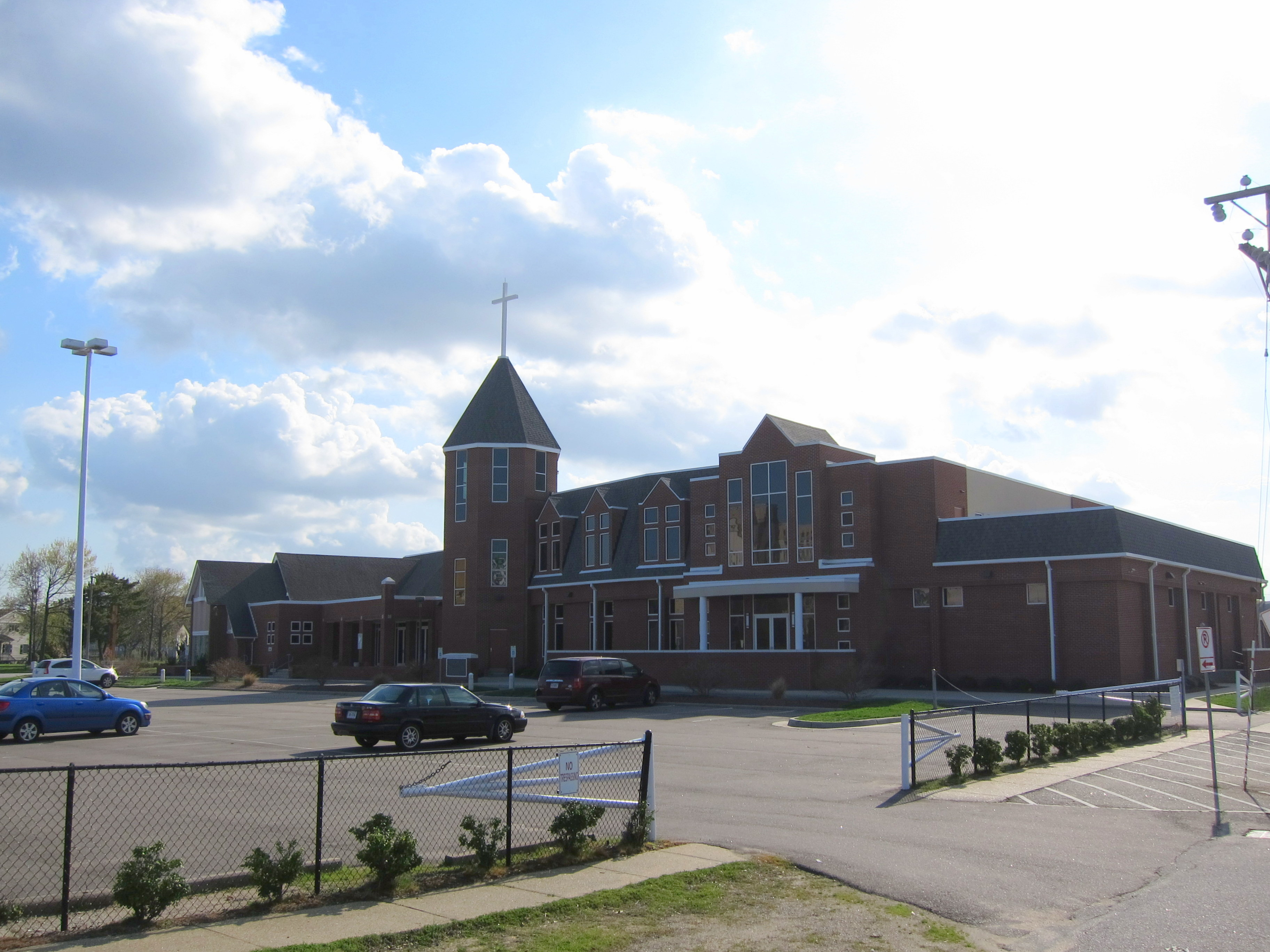
Star of the Sea Catholic Church

34.4% of the city's population is affiliated with religious congregations, compared to the 50.2% nationwide figure. There are 146,402 adherents and 184 different religious congregations in the city:

- 28% Catholic Church
- 14% Southern Baptist Convention
- 13% United Methodist Church
- 12% Charismatic Churches Independent
- 33% Other

== Economy ==
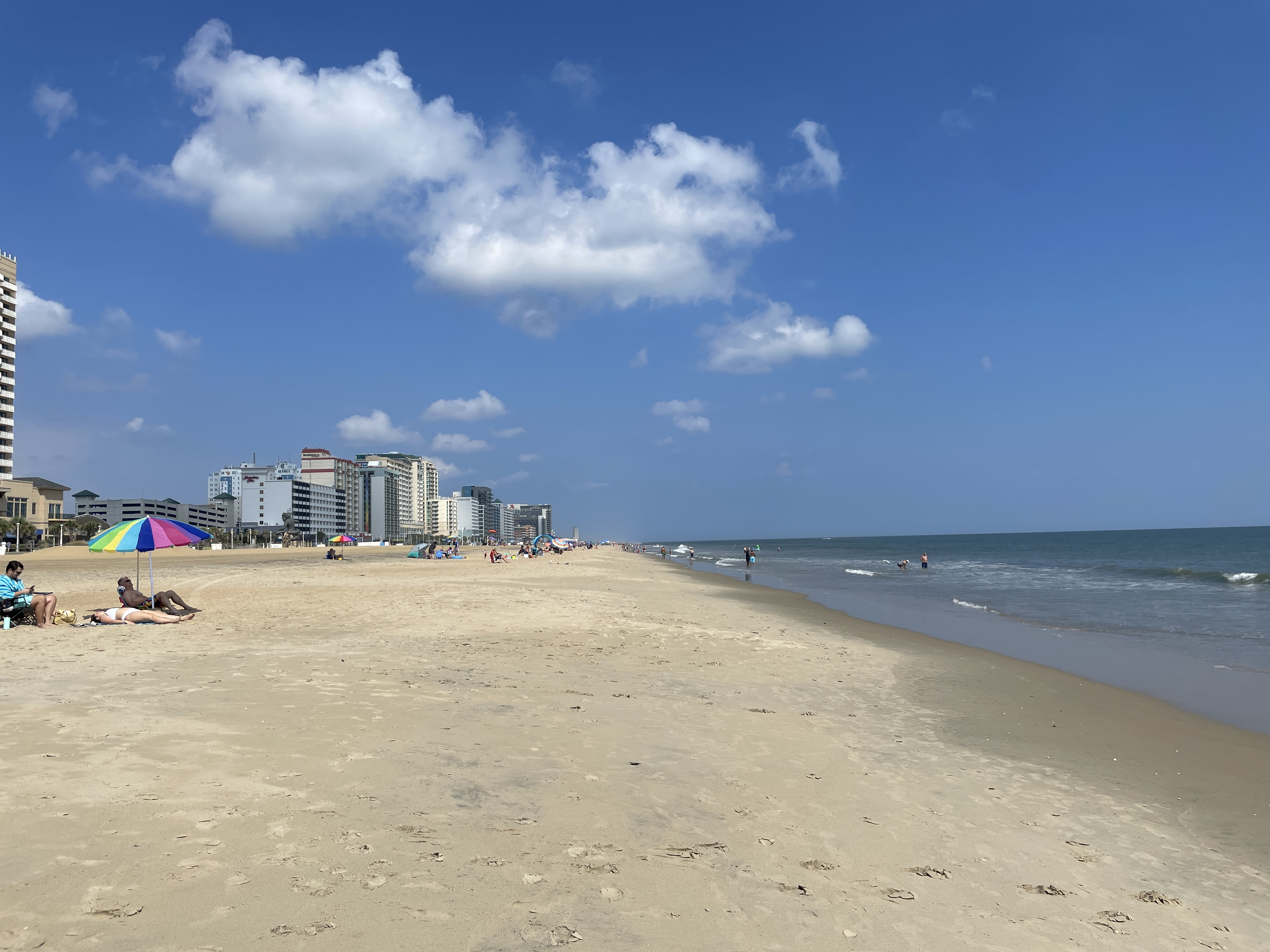
Beach along the Atlantic Ocean in Virginia Beach

Virginia Beach is composed of a variety of industries, including national and international corporate headquarters, advanced manufacturers, defense contractors and locally owned businesses. The city's location and business climate have made it a hub of international commerce, as nearly 200 foreign firms have established a presence, an office location or their North American headquarters in Hampton Roads. Twenty internationally based firms have their U.S. or North American headquarters in Virginia Beach, including companies like Stihl, London Bridge Trading Company, Busch Vacuum Solutions, IMS Gear, and Sanjo Corte Fino. Other major companies headquartered in Virginia Beach include Amerigroup, the Christian Broadcasting Network and Operation Blessing International. Other major employers include GEICO, VT and Navy Exchange Service Command. In addition, Virginia Beach is home to a number of small, innovative companies, such as Morphix Technologies, who cater for military industry. In September 2023, it was announced that Amazon will build 2 new operational delivery facilities in Virginia Beach. Virginia Beach was ranked at number 45 on Forbes list of best places for business and careers.

Tourism produces a large share of Virginia Beach's economy. With an estimated $857 million spent in tourism related industries, 14,900 jobs cater to 2.75 million visitors. City coffers benefit as visitors provide $73 million in revenue. Virginia Beach opened a Convention Center in 2005 which caters to large group meetings and events. Hotels not only line the oceanfront but also cluster around Virginia Beach Town Center and other parts of the city. Restaurants and entertainment industries also directly benefit from Virginia Beach's tourism.

Virginia Beach has a large agribusiness sector which produces $80 million for the city economy. One hundred-seventy-two farms exist in Virginia Beach, mostly below the greenline in the southern portion of the city. Farmers are able to sell their goods and products at the city's Farmer's Market.

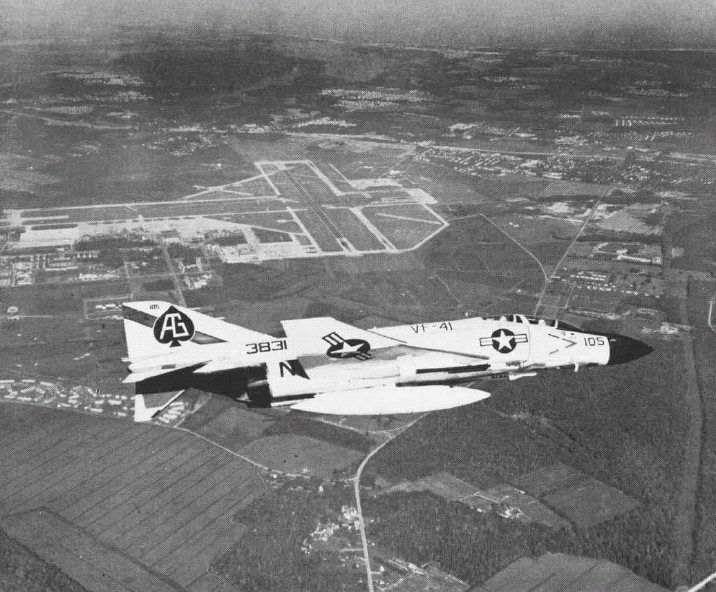
A VF-41 F-4J over NAS Oceana in the late 1960s

Virginia Beach is home to several U.S. military bases. These include the United States Navy's NAS Oceana and Training Support Center Hampton Roads, and the Joint Expeditionary Base East located at Cape Henry. Additionally, NAB Little Creek is located mostly within the city of Virginia Beach but carries a Norfolk address.

NAS Oceana is the largest employer in Virginia Beach; it was decreed by the 2005 BRAC Commission that NAS Oceana must close unless the city of Virginia Beach condemns houses in areas designated as "Accident Potential Zones." This action has never been the position of the United States Navy; indeed, the Navy had not recommended NAS Oceana to the BRAC Commission for potential closure.

Both NAS Oceana and Training Support Center Hampton Roads are considered to be the largest of their respective kind in the world. Furthermore, located in nearby Norfolk is the central hub of the United States Navy's Atlantic Fleet, Naval Station Norfolk.

54% of the 171,000 people working in Virginia Beach live in the city, 12% live in Chesapeake, and 10% live in Norfolk. An additional 99,600 people commute from Virginia Beach, with 35% going to Norfolk and 23% going to Chesapeake. Unemployment has been cut almost in half over the past two years going from a high of 4.2% in January 2017 to 2.8% in June 2019.

== Culture ==
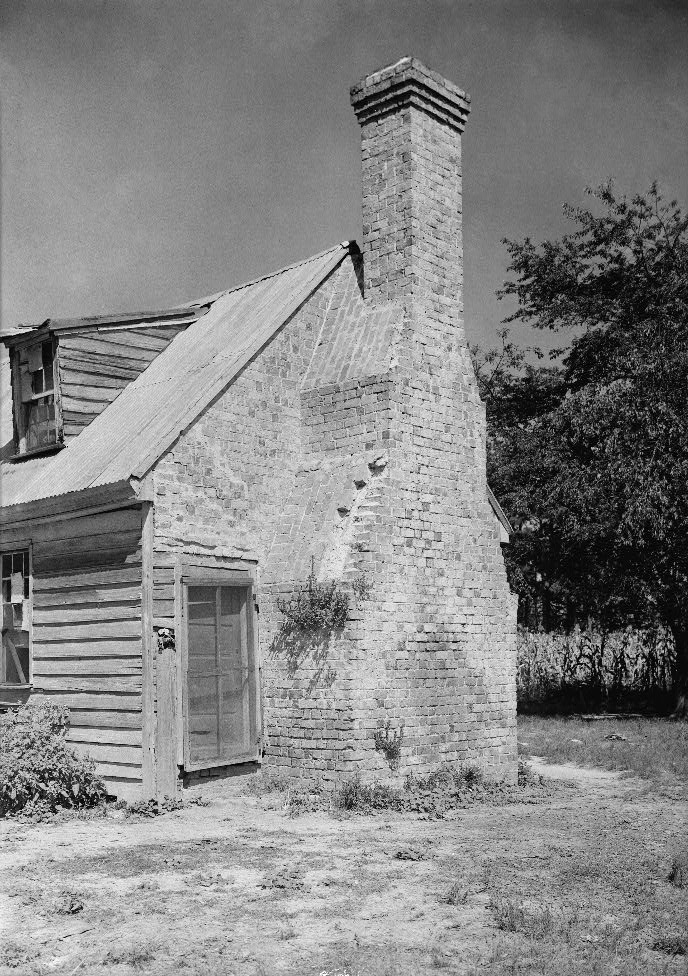
Adam Thoroughgood House, before 1957 restoration

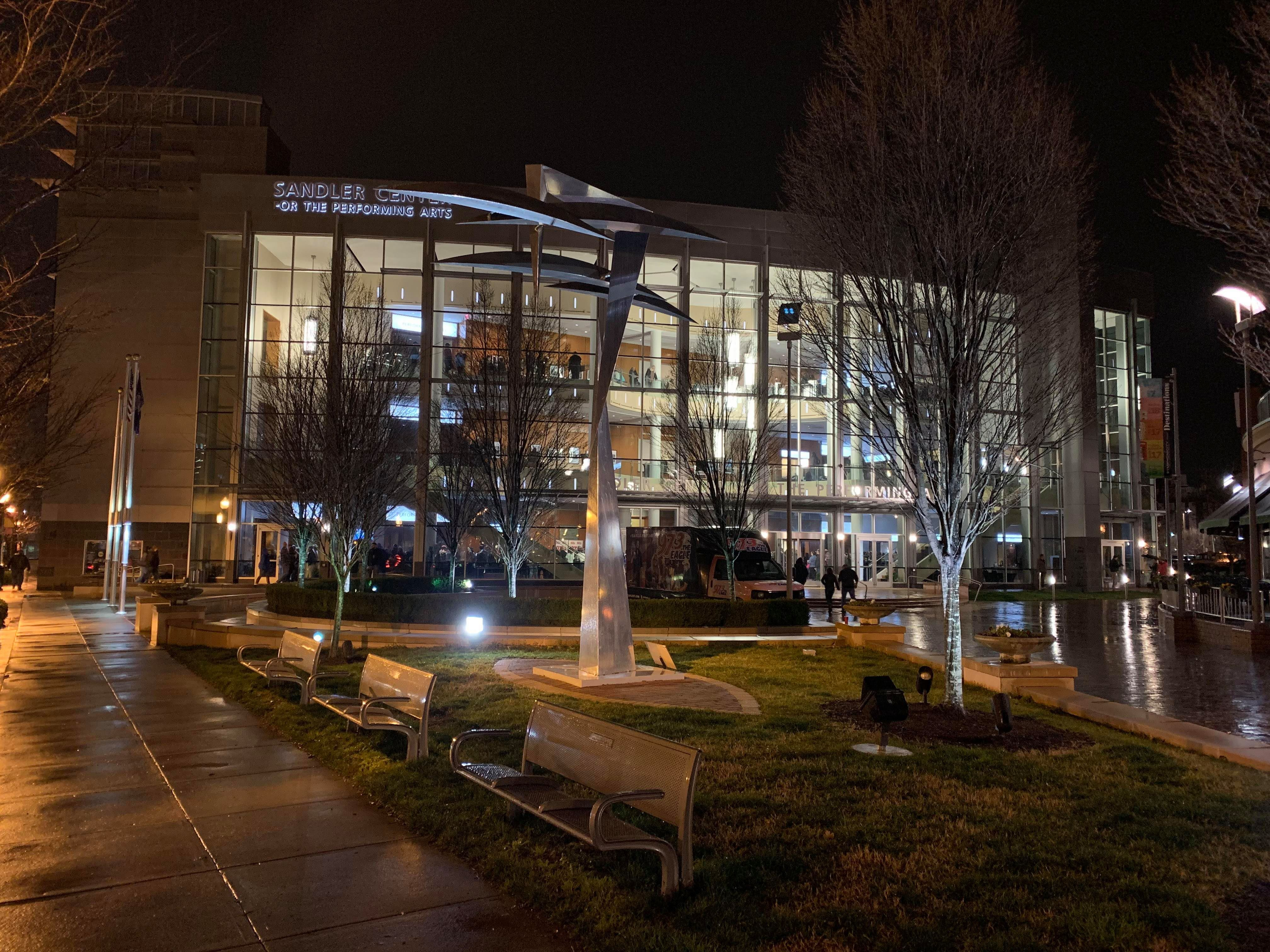
The Sandler Center located in Town Center, features performing arts, concerts, forums, and many other events.

The city is home to several points of interest in the historical, scientific, and visual/performing arts areas, and has become a popular tourist destination in recent years. The Virginia Museum of Contemporary Art features regularly changing exhibitions in a variety of media. Exhibitions feature painting, sculpture, photography, glass, video and other visual media from internationally acclaimed artists as well as artists of national and regional renown. MOCA was born from the annual Boardwalk Art Show, which began in 1952 and is now the museum's largest fundraiser.

The Virginia Aquarium & Marine Science Center (formerly the Virginia Marine Science Museum) is a popular aquarium near the oceanfront that features various sharks, sting rays, sea turtles, jellyfish, and octopuses.

One of the world's largest collections of World War I and World War II aircraft is located at the Military Aviation Museum in the Pungo area of Virginia Beach.

The Veterans United Home Loans Amphitheater at Virginia Beach, built in 1996, features a wide variety of popular shows and concerts. The Sandler Center, a 1200-seat performing arts theater, opened in the Virginia Beach Town Center in November 2007.

Virginia Beach is home to many sites of historical importance and has 18 sites on the National Register of Historic Places. Such sites include the Adam Thoroughgood House (one of the oldest surviving colonial homes in Virginia), the Francis Land House (a 200-year-old plantation), the Cape Henry Lights and nearby Cape Henry Light Station (a second tower), De Witt Cottage, Adam Keeling House, and others.

The Edgar Cayce Hospital for Research and Enlightenment was established in Virginia Beach in 1928 with 60 beds. The 67th street facility features a large private library of books on psychic matters and is open to the public. The traditional beach-architecture headquarters building features massage therapy by appointment. Cayce opened Atlantic University in 1930; it closed two years later but was re-opened in 1985. Atlantic University was originally intended for study of Cayce's readings and research on spiritual subjects.

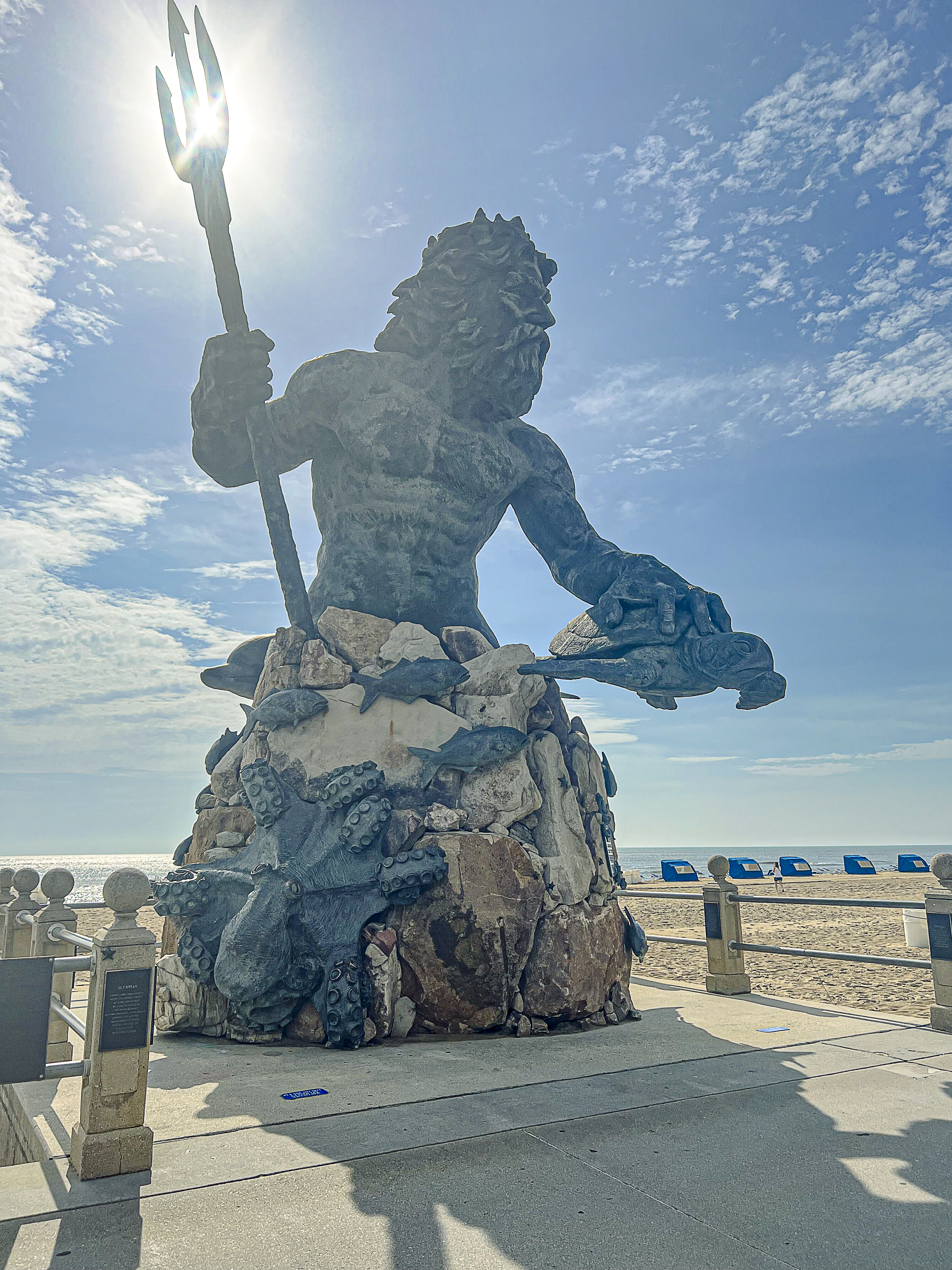
King Neptune statue in 2020

The city's largest festival, the Neptune Festival, attracts 500,000 visitors to the oceanfront and 350,000 visitors to the air show at NAS Oceana. Celebrating the city's heritage link with Norway, events are held in September in the oceanfront and Town Center areas. Every Labor Day Weekend, the American Music Festival provides festival attendees with live music performed on stages all over the oceanfront, including the beach on Fifth Street. The festival formerly ended with the Rock 'n' Roll Half Marathon, but no longer since the cancelation of the event in the city. Last Night On The Town is an annual New Year's Eve celebration that takes place every December 31.

== Sports ==
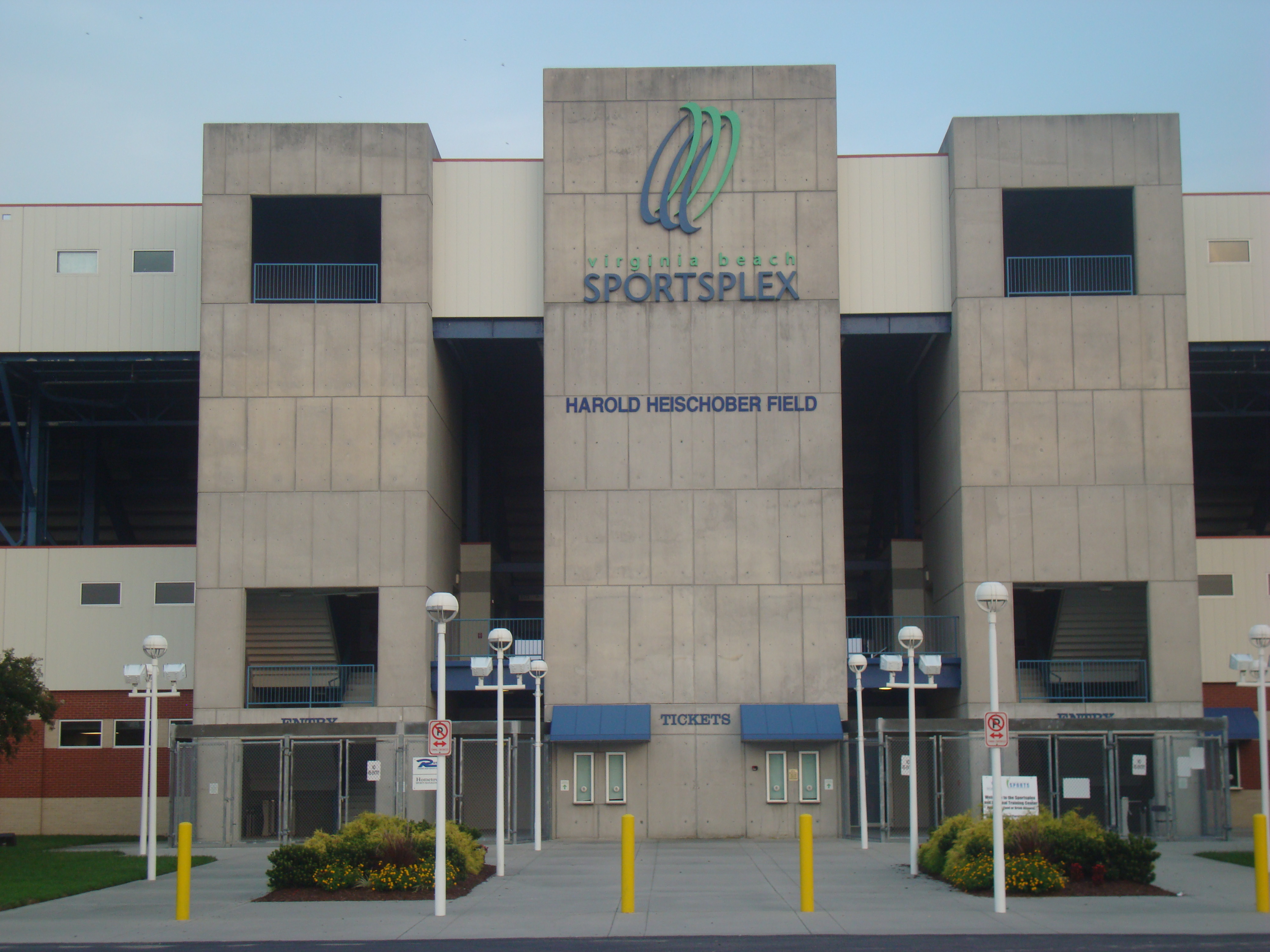
Virginia Beach Sportsplex

Club	League	Venue	Established
Virginia Beach United FC	USL League Two Soccer	Virginia Beach Sportsplex	2019

Since Norfolk contains the central business district of Hampton Roads, most of the major spectator sports are located there. While the Hampton Roads area has been recently considered as a viable prospect for major-league professional sports, and regional leaders have attempted to obtain Major League Baseball, NBA and NHL franchises in the recent past, no team has yet relocated to the area. Hampton Roads is the largest metropolitan area in the United States without a club in a major professional sports league.

The Norfolk Admirals won the AHL Calder Cup in 2012.

The Virginia Destroyers, a UFL franchise, played at the Virginia Beach Sportsplex until the league's collapse in 2012. Virginia Beach Professional Baseball, LLC, was awarded an Atlantic League franchise in April 2013. Known as the Virginia Beach Neptunes, they have yet to play a game due to delays in building Wheeler Field. Two soccer teams, the Virginia Beach Piranhas, a men's team in the USL Premier Development League, and the Hampton Roads Piranhas, a women's team in the W-League play at the Virginia Beach Sportsplex. The Virginia Beach Sportsplex contains the central training site for the U.S. women's national field hockey team.

The city is also home to the East Coast Surfing Championships, an annual contest of more than 100 of the world's top professional surfers and an estimated 400 amateur surfers. This is North America's oldest surfing contest.

There are eleven golf courses open to the public in the city, as well as four country club layouts and 36 military holes at NAS Oceana's Aeropines course. Among the best-known public courses are Hell's Point Golf Club and Virginia Beach National, the latter of which hosted the Virginia Beach Open, a Nationwide Tour event from 2000 to 2006. Also, the Kingsmill Resort in nearby Williamsburg hosts the Kingsmill Championship, an annual LPGA Tour tournament.

Virginia Beach is host to a Rock 'n' Roll Half Marathon each year on Labor Day weekend in conjunction with the American Music Festival. It is one of the largest Half Marathons in the world. The final 3 miles (4.8 km) are on the boardwalk. Virginia Beach also hosts the Yuengling Shamrock Marathon, founded in 1973 with over 24,000 participants. It is an annual race over St. Patrick's Day weekend and was recognized by Runner's World as one of the Top 20 marathons in the country in 1992.

In the mid-1980's Virginia Beach achieved notoriety for constructing the first skateboard ramps to be funded, maintained, and operated by a municipality. As of 2024 the City of Virginia Beach Parks & Recreation Department maintains three skateparks: Mount Trashmore Skatepark, Williams Farm Skatepark, and Woodstock Park Skate Plaza, which is a park constructed above a 5 million gallon underground wastewater storage facility.

== Parks and recreation ==
Virginia Beach is home to 210 city parks, encompassing over 4,000 acres (1,600 ha), including neighborhood parks, community parks, district parks, and other open spaces.

Mount Trashmore Park is clearly visible from I-264 when traveling to the oceanfront. The hill measures 60 ft (18 m) high and is the highest point in Virginia Beach.

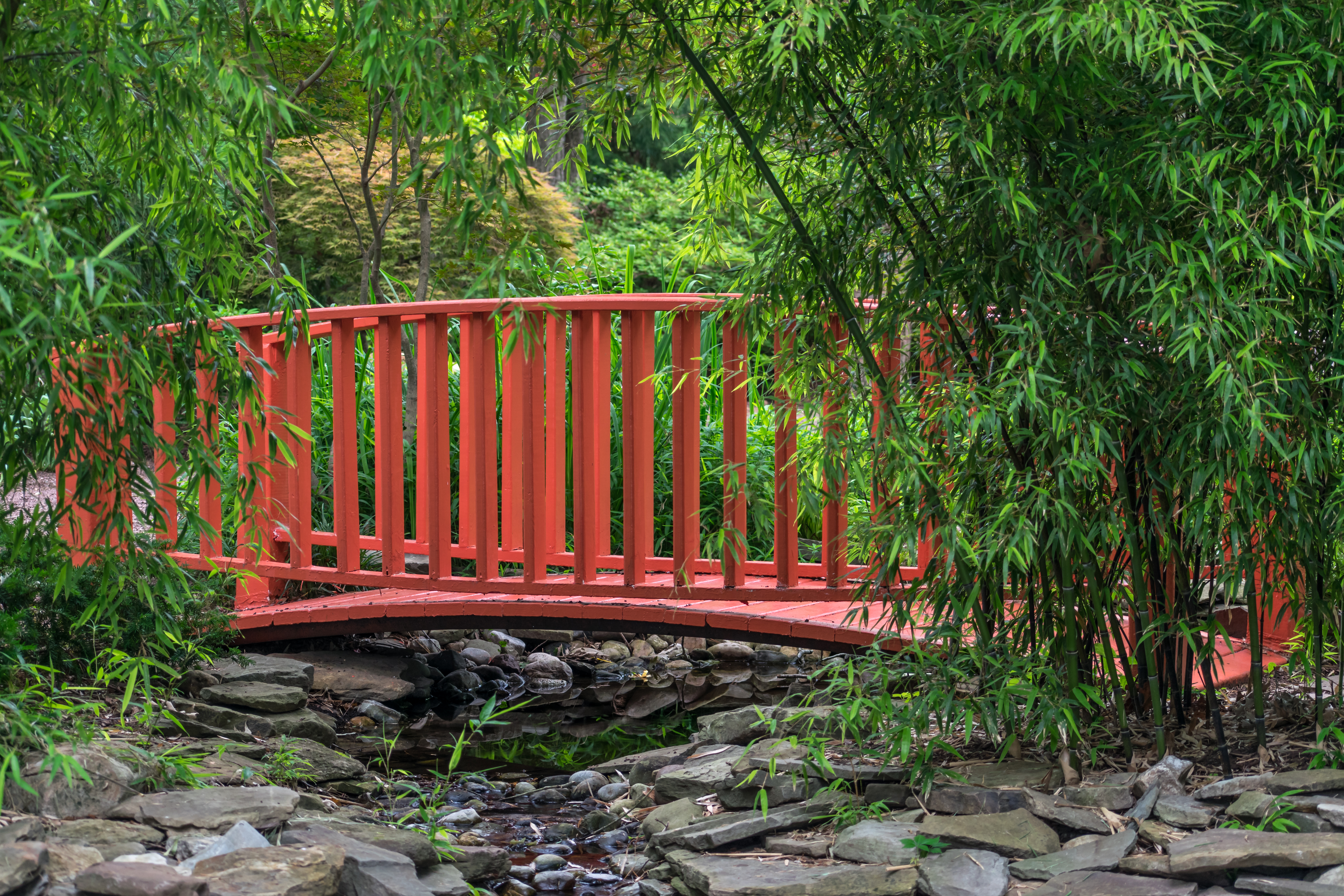
A Japanese-style moon bridge in the Miyazaki Japanese Garden, Red Wing Park

One of the major parks is Red Wing Park, a 97 acres (39 ha) park in east-central part of the city, very close to Oceana Naval Air Station. This land became a park in 1966. A unique feature of this park is the Miyazaki Japanese Garden, which is a result of its interactions with its sister city Miyazaki, Japan.

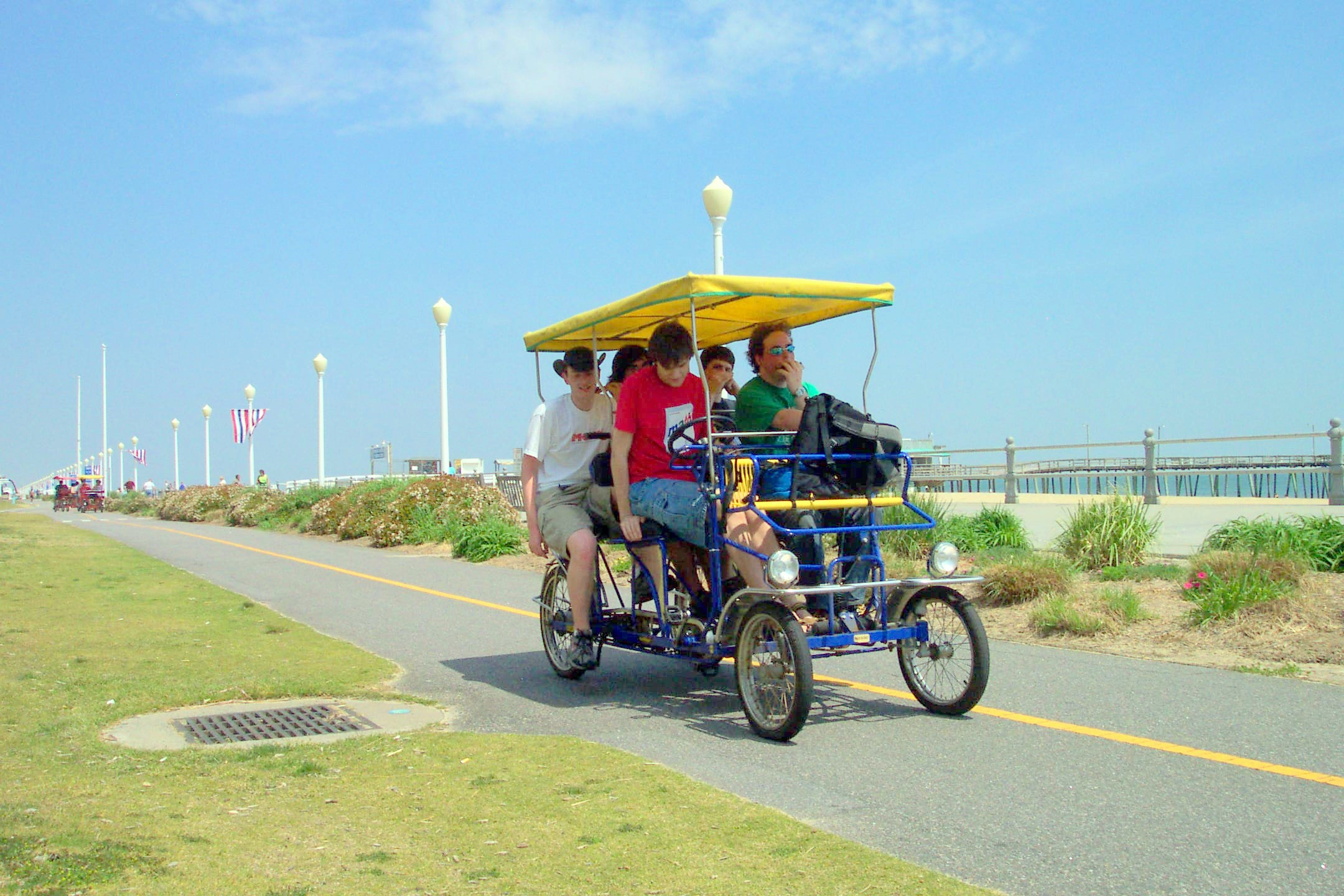
People riding a rental surrey on the boardwalk

The Back Bay National Wildlife Refuge, established in 1938, is an 8,000-acre (32 km^{2}) freshwater refuge that borders the Atlantic Ocean on the east and Back Bay on the west. It is managed by the U.S. Fish and Wildlife Service.

First Landing State Park and False Cape State Park are both located in coastal areas within the city's corporate limits as well.

Munden Point Park is a rural park located in the deep southern end of the city, right on The North Landing River.

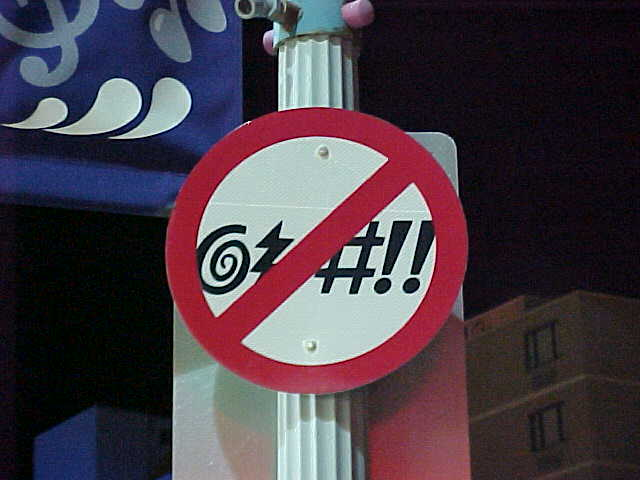
Local law prohibits the use of profanity in public areas in the city. This sign along Atlantic Avenue indicates this law

Pleasure House Point is a 118 acres (48 hectares) park of undeveloped land on the shore of the Lynnhaven River. It is also the location of the Brock Environmental Center.

Virginia Beach's extensive park system is recognized as one of the best in the United States. In its 2013 ParkScore ranking, The Trust for Public Land reported that Virginia Beach had the 8th best park system among the 50 most populous U.S. cities.

== Government ==
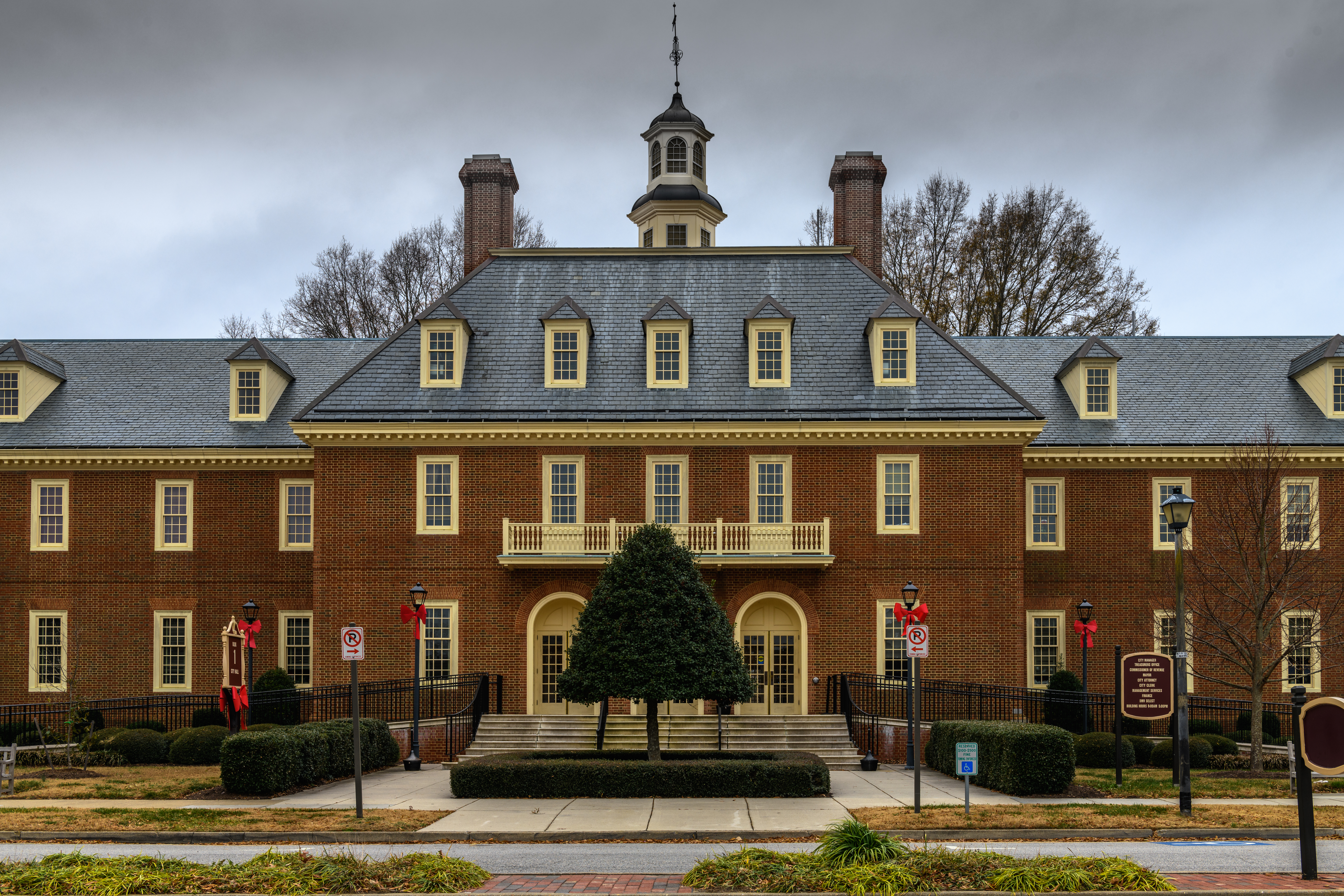
Virginia Beach old City Hall building

Historically, Virginia Beach had been more conservative than other large independent cities in Virginia. It consistently backed Republican Party presidential candidates from 1968 to 2016, and in all but two elections from 1952 to 2016. However, the Republican edge in the city has diminished in recent years. John McCain and Donald Trump only managed to win a plurality of the city's votes in 2008 and 2016, winning the city despite losing statewide. In 2020, Joe Biden became the first Democrat to carry Virginia Beach since 1964, and only the third to do so since Virginia Beach became an independent city. Biden became the first presidential candidate to win at least 51% of the vote in Virginia Beach since President George W. Bush in 2004. In 2024, the city stayed in the Democratic column and supported Kamala Harris, though at a slightly narrower margin than 2020.

United States presidential election results for Virginia Beach, Virginia
Year	Republican		Democratic		Third party(ies)	
Year	No.	%	No.	%	No.	%
1952	1,310	59.79%	881	40.21%	0	0.00%
1956	1,355	53.28%	1,111	43.69%	77	3.03%
1960	986	42.48%	1,301	56.05%	34	1.46%
1964	10,529	44.92%	12,892	55.00%	21	0.09%
1968	16,316	43.23%	10,101	26.76%	11,325	30.01%
1972	38,074	76.56%	10,373	20.86%	1,286	2.59%
1976	34,593	54.46%	25,824	40.66%	3,101	4.88%
1980	47,936	60.50%	24,895	31.42%	6,404	8.08%
1984	72,571	74.36%	24,703	25.31%	320	0.33%
1988	76,481	68.89%	33,780	30.43%	757	0.68%
1992	68,936	50.03%	44,294	32.15%	24,555	17.82%
1996	63,741	50.61%	52,142	41.40%	10,060	7.99%
2000	83,674	55.87%	62,268	41.58%	3,829	2.56%
2004	103,752	59.06%	70,666	40.22%	1,269	0.72%
2008	100,319	49.85%	98,885	49.14%	2,045	1.02%
2012	99,291	50.49%	94,299	47.95%	3,051	1.55%
2016	98,224	48.32%	91,032	44.79%	14,006	6.89%
2020	105,087	46.18%	117,393	51.59%	5,081	2.23%
2024	109,375	47.81%	115,412	50.45%	3,984	1.74%

Virginia Beach was chartered as a municipal corporation by the General Assembly of Virginia on January 1, 1963. The city currently operates under the council–manager form of government. Like all incorporated cities in Virginia, it is an independent city and does not fall under the jurisdiction of a county government.

The city's legislative body consists of an eleven-member city council. The city manager is appointed by the council and acts as the chief executive officer. Through his staff, he implements policies established by the council.

Members of the city council normally serve four-year terms and are elected on a staggered basis in non-partisan elections. Beginning in 2008, general elections are held the first Tuesday in November in even-numbered years. In previous years, elections were held the first Tuesday in May in even-numbered years. All registered voters are eligible to vote for all council members. Three council members and the mayor serve on an at-large basis. All others are elected by district (and must live in the district they represent): Bayside, Beach, Centerville, Kempsville, Lynnhaven, Princess Anne, and Rose Hall.

The mayor is elected to a four-year term through direct election. The mayor presides over city council meetings and serves as the ceremonial head and spokesperson of the city. A vice mayor is also elected by the city council at the first meeting following a council election.

Citizens of Virginia Beach also elect five constitutional officers, and candidates for these offices are permitted to run with an affiliated political party. Three of these offices deal substantially with public safety and justice: the sheriff, commonwealth's attorney, and the clerk of the circuit court. The two other offices are concerned with fiscal policy: the city treasurer and the commissioner of the revenue. The city provides law enforcement through the Virginia Beach Police Department and emergency services through the Virginia Beach Fire Department.

Virginia Beach is located entirely in Virginia's 2nd congressional district, served by Republican Jen Kiggans.

Virginia Beach is one of the few cities in the state with laws that prohibit profanity in public spaces. The law was repealed by the State Legislature in early 2020. It is considered a Class 3 misdemeanor.

== Education ==
According to the U.S. Census, 28.1% of the population over twenty-five (vs. a national average of 24%) hold a bachelor's degree or higher, and 90.4% (vs. 80% nationally) have a high school diploma or equivalent.

Prior to 1969, separate schools were maintained for black and white students. Before 1938, black students who wished to attend school past seventh grade had to travel to Norfolk and pay tuition to attend Booker T. Washington High School. In 1938, the first high school for blacks, the Princess Anne County Training School was built. In 1961, in order to avoid the stigma of the term "training school", the school was renamed Union Kempsville High School at the request of the black community. When the public schools integrated in 1969, Union Kempsville was closed.

The city of Virginia Beach is home to Virginia Beach City Public Schools, one of the largest school systems in the state (based on student enrollment). Virginia Beach City Public Schools currently serves 69,735 students, and includes 56 elementary schools, 14 middle schools, 12 high schools which include Landstown, Princess Anne, Green Run, Green Run Collegiate, Cox, Tallwood, Salem, First Colonial, Kellam, Kempsville, Bayside, and Ocean Lakes High Schools as well as a number of secondary/post-secondary specialty schools and centers such as the Advanced Technology Center (ATC).

There are also a number of private, independent schools in the city, including Chesapeake Bay Academy and Tidewater Collegiate Academy (both on the campus of Batten University), Our Lady of Mount Carmel Catholic School and Parish, Strelitz International Academy (formerly the Hebrew Academy of Tidewater), Catholic High School (formerly Bishop Sullivan Catholic and, before that, Norfolk Catholic), Baylake Pines School, (closed in 2014), and Virginia Beach Friends School.

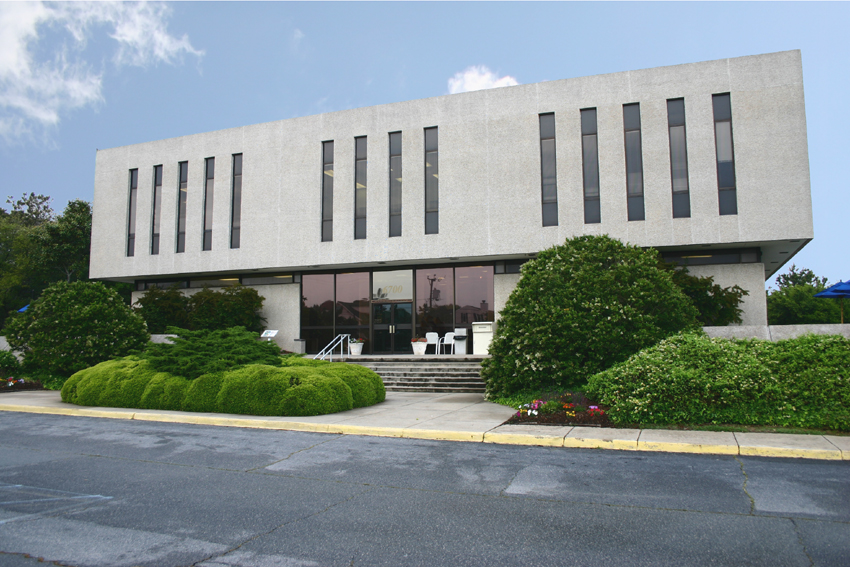
Association for Research and Enlightenment

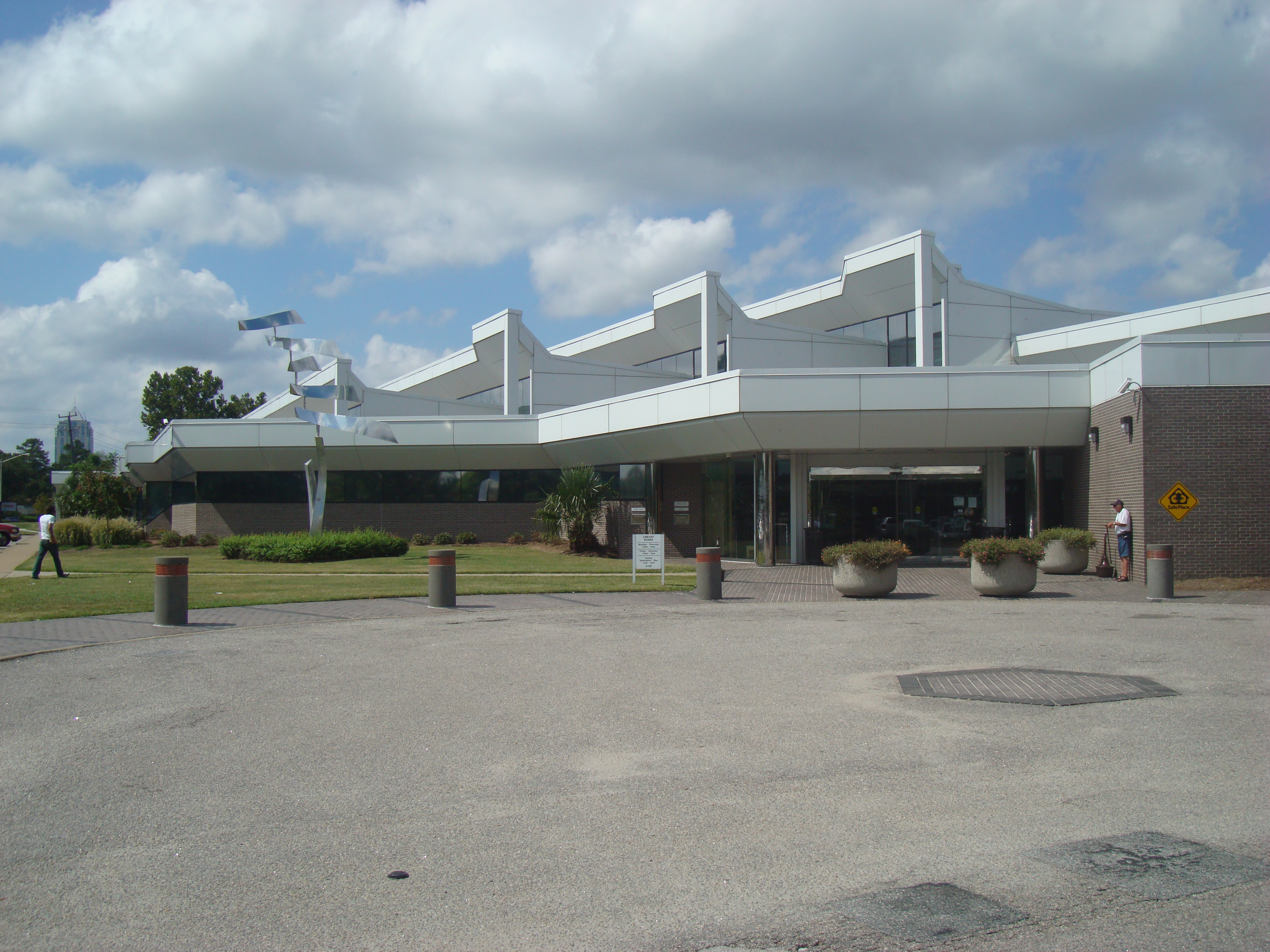
Meyera E. Oberndorf Central Library, Virginia Beach Public Library System

Virginia Beach is home to three universities and branch centers for several other universities. Atlantic University a for-profit holistic learning institution is located in Virginia Beach and was founded in 1930. Regent University, a private university founded by Christian evangelist and leader Pat Robertson, has historically focused on graduate education but has recently established an undergraduate program as well. Batten University is a private university in Virginia Beach, Virginia, that was founded in 1961 by Methodist minister Joseph Shackford Johnston.

Old Dominion University and Norfolk State University are in nearby Norfolk but operate a joint Center in Virginia Beach. Both the University of Virginia and Virginia Tech operate satellite campuses in Virginia Beach. Tidewater Community College, a major junior college, also has its largest campus located in the city. ECPI University, a for-profit career college, has its headquarters in Virginia Beach. Additional institutions of higher education are located in other communities of greater Hampton Roads.

The Virginia Beach Public Library System provides free access to accurate and current information and materials to all individuals and promotes reading as a critical life skill. The library system has a collection of more than 1 million items including special subject collections. VBPL has 10 main library branches, not including their bookmobile.

== Media ==
The Virginian-Pilot, based in Norfolk, is the daily newspaper for Virginia Beach. Other papers include Veer and the New Journal and Guide. Inside Business focuses on local business news.

The Hampton Roads/Norfolk/Portsmouth/Virginia Beach area is served by a variety of radio stations on the AM and FM bands, with towers located around the Hampton Roads area.

Virginia Beach is also served by several television stations. The Norfolk-Portsmouth-Newport News designated market area (DMA) is the 42nd largest in the U.S. with 712,790 homes (0.64% of the total U.S.). The major network television affiliates are WTKR 3 (CBS), WAVY-TV 10 (NBC), WVEC 13 (ABC), WTPC-TV 21 (Trinity Broadcasting Network), WGNT 27 (CW), WTVZ-TV 33 (MyNetworkTV), WVBT 43 (Fox), and WPXV 49 (ION Television). The Public Broadcasting Service station is WHRO-TV 15. Virginia Beach residents also can receive independent station WSKY broadcasting on channel 4 from Camden County, North Carolina. Some can also receive PBS affiliate WUND 2 (UNC-TV), Home Shopping Network affiliate W14DC-D from Portsmouth, Daystar Network religious television station WVAD-LD TV 25 from Chesapeake and RTV affiliate WGBS-LD broadcasting on channel 7 from Hampton. Virginia Beach is served by Cox Cable. DirecTV and Dish Network are also popular as an alternative to cable television in Virginia Beach. In addition a large portion of the city is served by Verizon FIOS.

Virginia Beach serves as the headquarters for the Christian Broadcasting Network, located adjacent to Regent University. CBN's most notable program, The 700 Club originates from the Virginia Beach studios. In 2008, Virginia Beach became the home to the Reel Dreams Film Festival.

== Infrastructure ==
=== Transportation ===
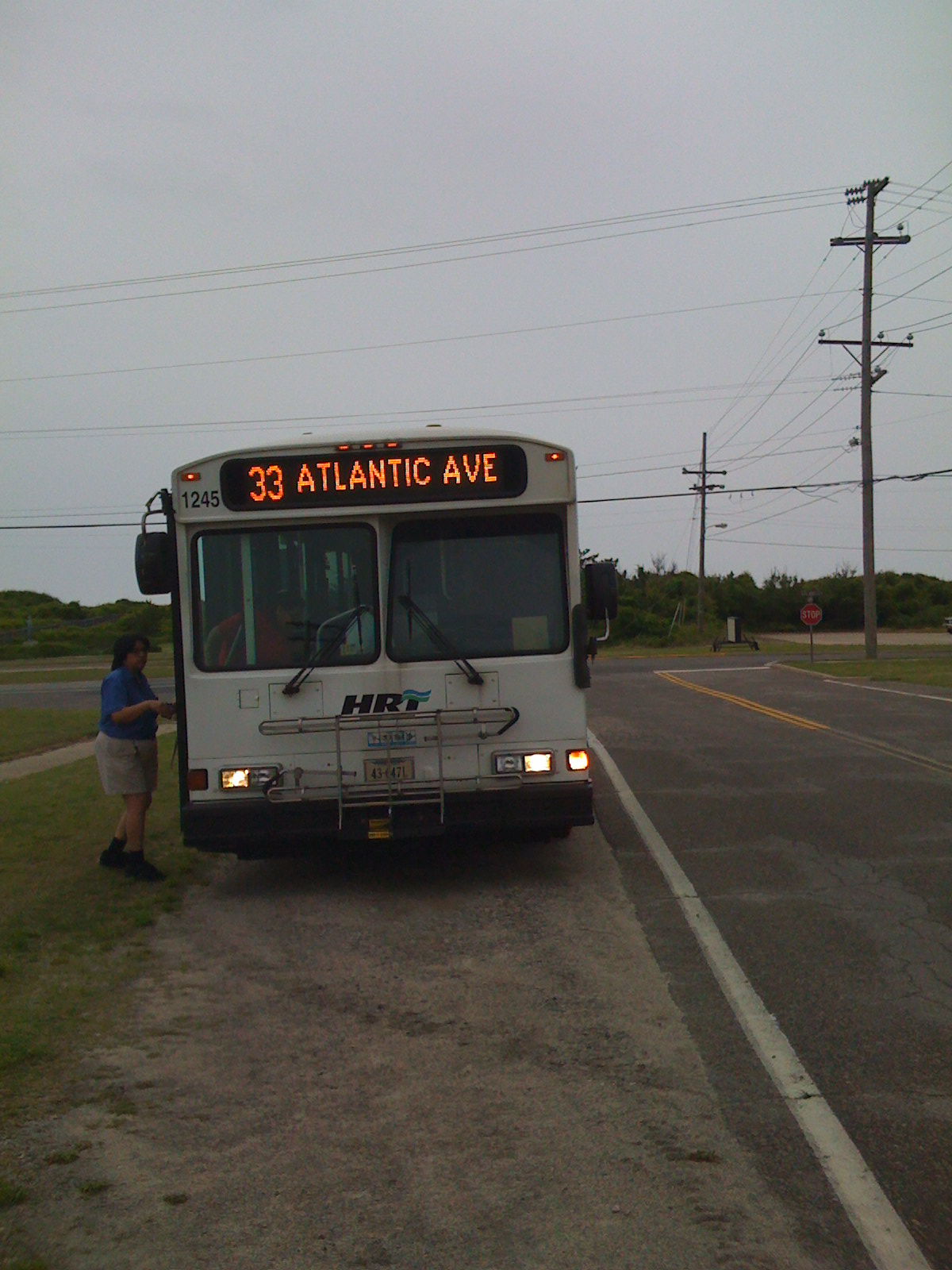
A Hampton Roads Transit bus on Atlantic Avenue in Virginia Beach.

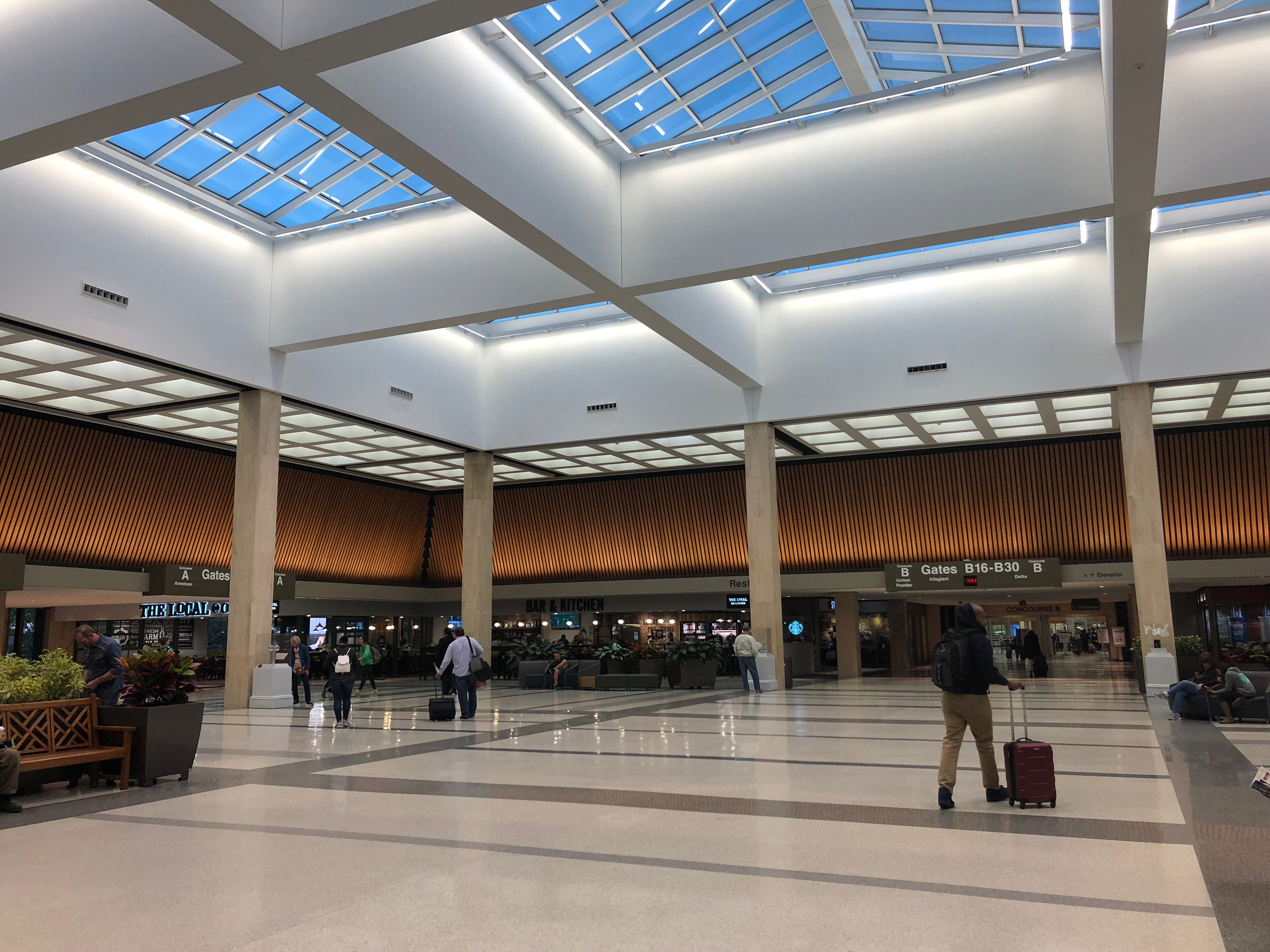
Norfolk International Airport in nearby Norfolk serves the city of Virginia Beach and the surrounding Hampton Roads area.

Virginia Beach is primarily served by the Norfolk International Airport, which is now the region's major commercial airport. The airport is located near Chesapeake Bay, along the city limits straddling neighboring Norfolk. Newport News/Williamsburg International Airport also provides commercial air service for the Hampton Roads area. The Chesapeake Regional Airport provides general aviation services and is located five miles (8.0 km) outside the city limits.

Virginia Beach Airport is a small, grass runway facility catering to private aircraft owners.

Rail-wise, Virginia Beach is served by Amtrak through the Norfolk and Newport News stations, via connecting buses. A high-speed rail connection at Richmond to both the Northeast Corridor and the Southeast High Speed Rail Corridor are also under study.

Greyhound and Trailways provide service from a central bus terminal in adjacent Norfolk. The Greyhound station in Virginia Beach is located on Laskin Road, about a mile west of the oceanfront. Bus services to New York City via the Chinatown bus, Today's Bus, is located on Newtown Road.

The Virginia Breeze intercity bus line added service to Virginia Beach on April 20, 2026, stopping at the Virginia Beach Convention Center. The added service, known as the Tidewater Current, connects to Norfolk, Newport News, Williamsburg, Richmond and Richmond International Airport, Charlottesville, and Staunton.

The city is connected to I-64 via I-264, which runs from the oceanfront, intersects with I-64 on the east side of Norfolk, and continues through downtown Norfolk and Portsmouth until rejoining I-64 at the terminus of both roads in Chesapeake where I-664 completes the loop which forms the Hampton Roads Beltway. Other major roads include Virginia Beach Boulevard (US 58), Shore Drive (US 60), which connects to Atlantic Avenue at the oceanfront, Northampton Blvd (US 13), Princess Anne Road (SR 165), Indian River Road (former SR 603), Lynnhaven Parkway, Independence Boulevard, General Booth Boulevard, and Nimmo Parkway.

The city is also connected to Virginia's Eastern Shore region via the Chesapeake Bay Bridge-Tunnel, which is the longest bridge-tunnel complex in the world and known as one of the Seven Engineering Wonders of the Modern World. The Chesapeake Bay Bridge-Tunnel, a tolled facility, carries US 13.

Transportation within the city, as well as the rest of Hampton Roads is served by a regional bus service, Hampton Roads Transit. An extension of The Tide light rail system from Norfolk to the oceanfront has been proposed multiple times, but has been rejected by voters every time.

==== Walkability ====
A 2011 study by Walk Score ranked Virginia Beach the 39th most walkable of the fifty largest U.S. cities. A 2021 study by Walk Score ranked Virginia Beach as the 45th most walkable large city in the United States.

=== Utilities ===
Water and sewer services are provided by the City's Department of Utilities. Virginia Beach receives its electricity from Dominion Virginia Power which has local sources including the Chesapeake Energy Center (a gas power plant), coal-fired plants in Chesapeake and Southampton County, and the Surry Nuclear Power Plant. Norfolk headquartered Virginia Natural Gas, a subsidiary of AGL Resources, distributes natural gas to the city from storage plants in James City County and Chesapeake.

Currently, water for the Tidewater area is pumped from Lake Gaston, which straddles the Virginia-North Carolina border along with the Blackwater and Nottoway rivers.

The city provides wastewater services for residents and transports wastewater to the regional Hampton Roads Sanitation District treatment plants.

Broadband internet service is provided by Cox Communications throughout the majority of the city. Verizon also provides its Fios internet service, but in limited areas as of 2021.

=== Healthcare ===
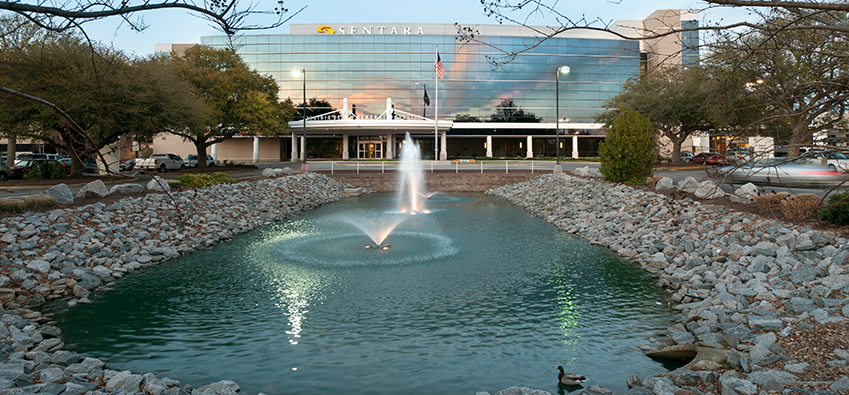
Sentara Virginia Beach General Hospital

Virginia Beach is served by Sentara Virginia Beach General Hospital and Sentara Princess Anne Hospital. The former Sentara Bayside Hospital, now known as Sentara Independence, has been modified to a stand alone Emergency Department and outpatient treatment center. Sentara Leigh Hospital is just across the city line in Norfolk. Beach Health clinic offers basic medical services for uninsured residents of Virginia Beach.

== Sister cities ==
Virginia Beach's sister Cities are:

- Bangor, County Down, Northern Ireland, United Kingdom (2001)
- Miyazaki, Japan (1992)
- Moss, Norway (1974)
- Olongapo, Philippines (2015)
- Waiblingen, Germany (2016)

=== Friendly cities ===
Virginia Beach has friendly relations with:

- San Juan del Sur, Nicaragua (1974)

== In popular culture ==
The Monopoly Here and Now: The US edition (2015) of the game, released in honor of the game's 80th birthday, included Virginia Beach as a property that could be bought, sold and traded. The city was included after Hasbro held an online vote in order to determine which cities would make it into an updated version of the game. Virginia Beach received the fourth highest number of votes in the online contest, earning it a green spot on the board. The top Boardwalk spot went to Pierre, South Dakota.

In the television series, The Man in the High Castle (2015–2019), which is set in an alternate 1960s, Virginia Beach is mentioned as being the site of a D-Day style invasion by Nazi Germany, which led to the defeat of the United States and its occupation.

Rapper Lil Ugly Mane, famous for albums like Mista Thug Isolation and Oblivion Access has lived in Virginia Beach, Virginia.

Popular rapper Drake named a track off of his album For All The Dogs after Virginia Beach, due to his performance at the city during his Drake vs. Lil Wayne tour in 2014.

== See also ==
- National Register of Historic Places listings in Virginia Beach, Virginia
- Norwegian Lady Statues
- Virginia Beach Department of EMS
- Virginia Beach Fire Department
- Virginia Beach Volunteer Rescue Squad
- Wash Woods at False Cape
- East Coast of the United States
- Southeastern United States
- Southern United States
