= Virginia Beach Surf & Rescue Museum =

- U.S. Coast Guard Station
- U.S. National Register of Historic Places
- Virginia Landmarks Register
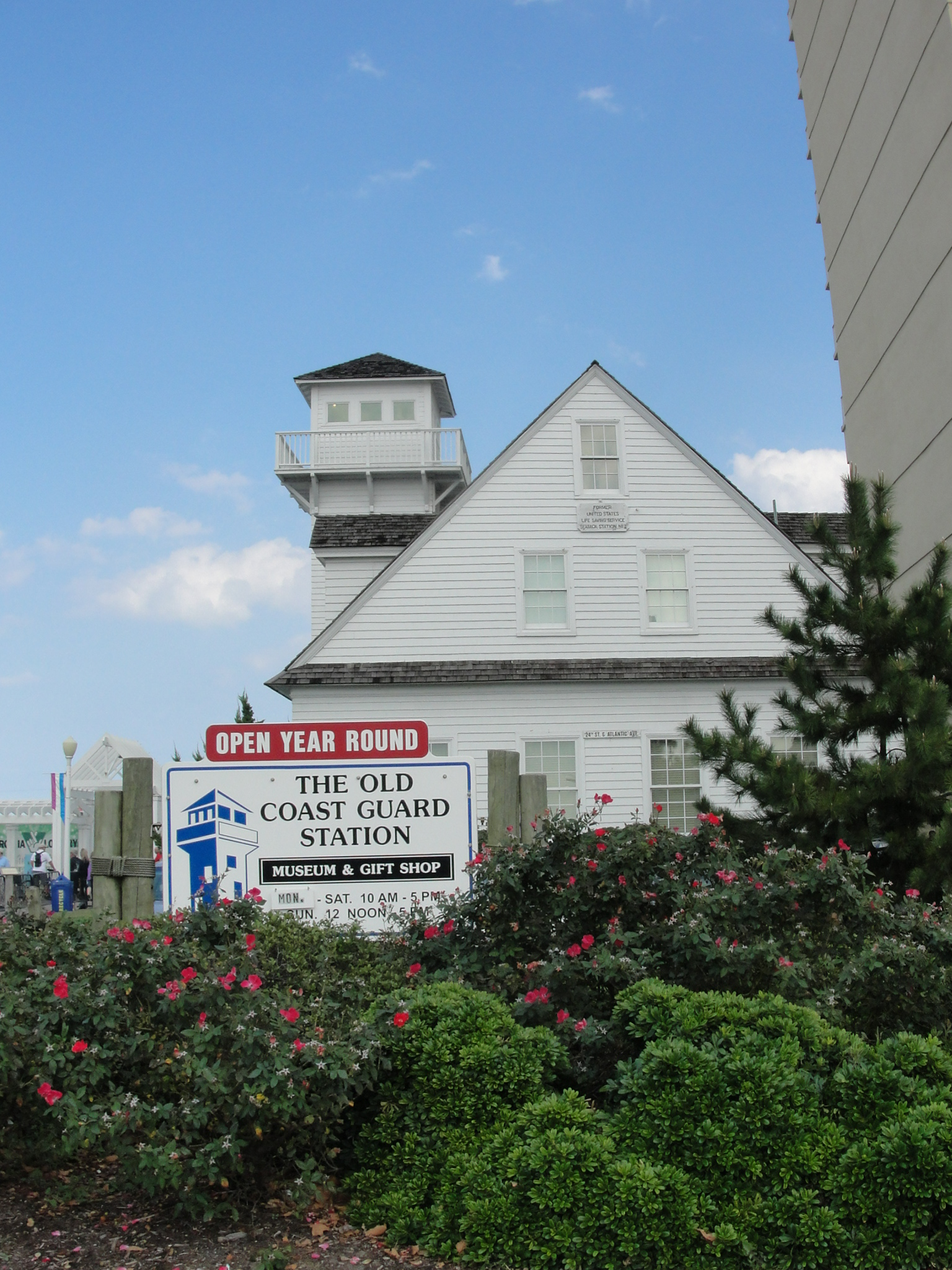

- Location within Virginia Location within the United States
- Location: Atlantic Ave. and 24th St., Virginia Beach, Virginia
- Coordinates: 36°51′11″N 75°58′35″W
- Area: less than one acre
- Built: 1903
- NRHP reference No.: 79003304
- VLR No.: 134-0047

Significant dates
- Added to NRHP: July 11, 1979
- Designated VLR: March 20, 1979

The Virginia Beach Surf & Rescue Museum honors and preserves the history of Virginia's maritime heritage, coastal communities, the United States Lifesaving Service, and the United States Coast Guard along the Atlantic coast.

== History of the Revenue Cutter Service ==
In 1790, the United States Congress empowered the secretary of the treasury Alexander Hamilton to construct ten cutters to acquire custom duties from foreign ships visiting the ports of the young nation. The ten cutters provided 92% of the young nation's income with collections of custom duties. In six years the young nation's debt was paid off to foreign countries. The role of the Revenue Cutter Service would expand to protecting the young nation in times of national security. The Revenue Cutter Service would be placed under the control of the United States Navy. This practice continues today with authorization from the president of the United States. The organization and rank formation of the United States Coast Guard coincides with the United States Navy for such emergencies. The officers and crew of the Revenue Cutter Service would collect a percentage of the fines, penalties, and forfeitures collected from offenders.

In 1878 the United States Congress passed a law that would join the Revenue Cutter Service and the United States Life-Saving Service to provide assistance to persons that had been shipwrecked. The joining of the two concerns; in regards to Life-Saving was a success. In 1882 superintendent of the United States Life-Saving Service Sumner I. Kimball wrote in a report that the success of the United States Life-Saving Service was enhanced by the Revenue Cutter Service. Sumner I. Kimball stated that "little wonder the United States Life-Saving Service has succeeded; the souls of such men have entered it, and it has become an incarnation. In the later years, the efforts of the two Services would help create the United States Coast Guard. The United States Revenue Cutter Service success is shown over a five year period from 1881 to 1885. The numbers that are shown are a yearly average: Saved from drowning 87, assisting vessels in distress 208, value of cargo on vessels $4,498,078, maintenance cost $843,595.

== History of United States Life-Saving Service ==
On December 14, 1854 the United States Congress passed "An act for the better preservation of life and property from vessels shipwrecked on the coasts of the United States. The Civil War disrupted the formation of the United States Life-Saving Service. In the year 1870 a powerful storm caused many deaths and newspaper editors called for "reform to check the terrible fatalities off our dangerous coasts" In the year 1871 the United States Life-Saving Service was formed under the Department of the Treasury. The Treasury Department appointed a lawyer named, Sumner Increase Kimball as the chief of the Treasury Department's Revenue Marine Division The United States Life-Saving Service was under the Revenue Marine Division. In 1878 the growing number of United States Life-Saving Service stations brought about the United States Life-Saving Service becoming a separate agency.

Kimball brought organization and standards to the USLSS that was once a mostly volunteer organization. During the volunteer times, only the "keepers" of these early stations were paid $200 a year. The crews of the early stations were un-paid volunteers. Through Kimball's guidance the number of Life-Saving Service stations grew to meet the need for rescuing victims of shipwrecks. The unforgivable coast line of the Northeast claimed many lives and much property. The number of USLSS stations was greater in the Northeast than in the moderate climate and more forgiving coastlines of the lower Southeast.

The USLSS served the United States with distinction for forty-four years. The success of the USLSS can be seen in economic terms and more importantly; peoples lives. In the forty-four years the USLSS assisted 28,121 ships and saved 178,741 lives.

== Life-saving stations and equipment ==
In November 1889 Sumner I. Kimball reported that there were 265 life-saving stations across the United States. The stations are occupied during the months of the active season. The active season was normally for the months of October to March, depending on the needs of the area patrolled. Each station had a keeper that was in charge of the quarters and the Surfmen. The keeper and the Surfmen would be responsible for patrolling the beach and maintaining a watch for vessels in distress. The patrols are conducted twenty-four hours a day during active season. The stations were equipped with surfboat, apparatus cart, Lyle gun, and breeches buoy.

The stations located in the Virginia Beach area were Cape Henry, Seatack, Dam Neck, Little Island, and False Cape.

The five stations located in Virginia Beach were located approximately two to five miles apart. The Surfmen would patrol the beaches in all types of weather. When storms and dark of night would restrict the visibility of the men in the watchtower, the surfman would patrol the beach. The surfmen would leave at a scheduled time and walk towards the opposite station. Once the surfmen met they would exchange a check. The check was a shaped piece of metal that resembles a modern-day police shield. According to Sumner Kimball the exchanging of checks would insure fidelity of the patrols. The isolated stations would record their patrol times with patrol clock. The clock would register the time when the surfmen reached the end of their patrol. All of the patrols were recorded and logged at the Life-Saving Station. If during a patrol a surfman spotted a ship in trouble, he would signal the ship with a Coston flare that help was on the way. The Coston flare would alert the other surfmen on watch or at the station. The surfmen would man the apparatus cart and pull and push the 1400 pound and above cart through wet sand, gale-force winds, and high surf to render aid to victims of a shipwreck. If conditions dictated it, the surfboat would be used. The surfboat was also placed on a wheeled cart to travel to a wreck. Upon arrival at the shipwreck; the keeper of the station would determine the method of rescue.

== The Seatack Station and the wreck of the Dictator ==
The first station was built in 1878. The station at Seatack, built in 1903 replacing the earlier structure, is now the museum at 24th street adjacent to the boardwalk of Virginia Beach, Virginia. The folk-lore of the name seatack has two possible explanations. The less probable is the story of a group of local militia that repelled a sea-attack from the British, during the War of 1812. The more likely story is that when mariners cleared Cape Henry, they would begin their first turn or sea tack.

There were many local heroes of the Seatack Station #2. Surfman John Woodhouse Sparrow was one of them. On December 21, 1900, a powerful storm forced the ship Jennie Hall aground ten miles south of Cape Henry. A surfman from the Dam Neck station named Carroll saw the Jennie Hall disabled, and he alerted his station. The Seatack Station was notified and a joint effort commenced. The Jennie Hall was a complete loss, but with the efforts of the surfmen there were survivors. Four seamen from the Jennie Hall were saved by surfboat. For his efforts, John Woodhouse Sparrow from the Seatack Station was awarded the USLSS Silver Lifesaving Medal. The wreck of the Jennie Hall is just one of the wrecks that occurred off the coast of Virginia Beach. There are photos, stories, and artifacts from various wrecks including the Dictator displayed at the museum. The Virginia Beach coastline is a part of the Graveyard of the Atlantic.

It is the shipwreck of the Dictator that the Seatack Station has been associated with for many years. On March 27, 1891, the Norwegian ship Dictator wrecked off the beach near the Seatack Station. A surfman named John L. Robinson was assigned to Seatack, and he told the story of the rescue. The ship wrecked around 10 am. The keeper of the station was a Captain Drinkwater. Drinkwater told his men that the ship was "coming ashore," and ordered them to "man the apparatus cart and get ready to go to the wreck." Robinson remembers that the storm was so severe that they could not use the beach for the cart. They had to use a "country road" that was partially blocked by fallen trees. The surfmen had to travel one and a half miles (2.4 km) to get to the beach. They arrived at the section of the beach where the ship now lay off the beach; broadside. He tells how waves were breaking over the ship and causing further damage to the ship He tells how the wind was so severe the Lyle gun was fired three times without success. The line that is fired from the Lyle gun has an optimal range of 695 yards, but with perfect conditions. He tells that the wind was so severe, the line would fall short.

The men on the ship saw the failed attempts of the Lyle gun and threw a wooden cask over board with a line attached. The cask made it to shore and the surfman placed the line for the breeches buoy in the cask. The crew of the Dictator rigged the line to their ship and prepared for the breeches buoy to be brought out to the ship. The breeches buoy is a life-ring with "britches" sewn onto the ring. The device would be placed on a hawser line and between the crew of the ship and the surfmen they would transport victims of shipwrecks from ship to shore.

The surfmen managed to bring three members of the Dictator safely to the beach, before wreckage of the ship tangled the hawser lines. The crew of the ship and the surfmen worried that time was running out for more rescues, because night was falling quickly. The Captain of the Dictator decided that he and his crew had to get off the ship soon. The Captain lowered a boat from the Dictator with four crew members. The small boat capsized in the large waves and the crew was now in the cold water. The crew started to swim for shore and the large waves pushed them into the shore. The surfmen had made fires on the beach to alert any survivors to their location. Robinson tells how miraculously all four Dictator crew members made it to the beach; alive. He also details how the Captain of the Dictator made his way to the beach. The Captain survived, but others did not, including his wife and their four-year-old son. The Captain tells how he decided to attempt to swim to the shore. He took a ladder from the ship and placed life-preservers on the ladder. The Captain, his wife, and their son would hold onto the ladder and hopefully be washed to the shore. A wave broke over the ladder and he did not see his wife again. The Captain heard his son crying and told him to hold his breath when a big wave broke over them. A large wave came and broke over the two and that was the last time he saw his son.

The Captain was the last survivor of the Dictator. A total of ten people survived but the ship was a total loss, with eight people drowned. In 1962 the Norwegian town of Moss sent a replica of the figurehead from the Dictator to the residents of Virginia Beach. A plaque on the figurehead tells how the people of Moss, Norway, commemorate all who perished during the rescue of the Dictator The figurehead is approximately 100 yards (91 m) north of the Old Coast Guard Station Museum.

== The United States Coast Guard ==
In 1915, the United States Lifesaving Service became the United States Coast Guard. The USLSS and the Revenue Cutter Service were combined to make the United States Coast Guard. The Seatack Station #2 became Coast Guard Station #162. The United States Coast Guard is now under the Department of Homeland Security. The Station was decommissioned in 1969 by the Coast Guard. The building was empty for ten years and scheduled for demolition, until Virginia Beach locals gained public support and formed the Virginia Beach Maritime Museum in 1979. The name of the museum was changed to the Life-Saving Museum of Virginia in 1988, but was changed to the Old Coast Guard Museum in 1996.

The Seatack Station was added to the National Register of Historic Places in 1979.

== Other Coast Guard museums ==
- Coast Guard Museum Northwest
- Port Orford Lifeboat Station Museum
- Sleeping Bear Point Coast Guard Station Maritime Museum
- USCGC Tamaroa (WMEC-166) (museum ship)

== See also ==
- Military Sea Services Museum
- National Register of Historic Places listings in Virginia Beach, Virginia
- List of maritime museums in the United States
