= Barnett K. Thoroughgood =

20th and 21st-century American Church of God pastor and church leader

- Commissioner of Ecclesiastical Services, Former Adjutant General of the Church of God in Christ
- Church: Church of God in Christ
- Diocese: Second Jurisdiction of Virginia
- Appointed: Commissioner of Ecclesiastical Services by Bishop Charles E Blake
- Successor: Bishop Matthew Williams

Orders
- Ordination: 1978 by = Bishop Samuel L. Green, Jr.
- Consecration: Adjutant Bishop in 2001 by Bishop Gilbert Earl Patterson

Personal details
- Born: November 7, 1949 Virginia Beach, VA
- Died: February 5, 2012 (aged 62) Virginia Beach, VA
- Spouse: Ernestine Coston Thoroughgood (1975-2012, his death)
- Children: 4, with 5 grandchildren
- Occupation: Christian Pastor and Bishop, Singer

Barnett Karl Thoroughgood (November 7, 1949 – February 5, 2012) was an African-American Holiness Pentecostal minister and church leader of the Church of God in Christ. He was an influential pastor in the city of Virginia Beach, Virginia, and the Hampton Roads area of Virginia known for his public service and who served as the Commissioner of Ecclesiastical Services and the Former Adjutant General of the COGIC denomination from 2001 until his death in 2012.

Thoroughgood, with serving in the capacity of Commissioner of Ecclesiastical Services, had the responsibilities of being the international chief minister of formal religious and civil protocol for the COGIC denomination, being the chief of security for COGIC clergy at COGIC's national conventions, supervising and overseeing the installation and ordination of bishops, and overseeing public relations for the denomination. He was the fifth person appointed to this office of Adjutant General in 2000 by Bishop Chandler David Owens. He was the first person consecrated to the office of Adjutant Bishop in 2001 by then-Presiding Bishop Gilbert Earl Patterson. He was appointed to the position of Commissioner of Ecclesiastical Services in 2008 by current Presiding Bishop, Bishop Charles E. Blake. He was succeeded by Bishop Matthew Williams of Orlando, FL.

== Biography ==
=== Early life and education ===
Thoroughgood was born November 7, 1949, in Princess Anne County in Virginia Beach, Virginia, to COGIC pastor, Elder John Thomas Thoroughgood and Mildred B. Cooper Thoroughgood.

Thoroughgood received his formal primary and secondary education through the Princess Anne County and Virginia Beach Public School System. He graduated from Union Kempsville High School in 1967. He attended Princess Anne Business College, 1968 - 1969 studying Standard Accounting and Business Management. He received a certificate of completion in Pastoral Counseling and Clinical Psychology from the Boston University, School of Theology, 1973–74; an Honorary Doctor of Divinity Degree from Trinity Hall College and Seminary, Springfield, Illinois, 1974; Certificate of Completion in Urban Ministries, CAUSA International Seminary, Atlanta, Georgia, 1985; Certificate of Completion in American, Israel, the Middle East's Relations and Continued Studies in Comparative Religion, Jerusalem Institute and Ben Goreum University, Israel and Project Interchange an Institute of the American Jewish Committee, Washington, D. C.; Norfolk Seminary and College, Norfolk, Virginia, Bachelor of Arts, 1995; and an Honorary Doctor of Ministry and a Masters of Divinity in 2000.

Thoroughgood married Virginia Beach native, Ernestine Coston in 1975. They had two sons, Emmanuel, and Jonathan, Bertram and one daughter, Mekia Bonita.

=== Ministry ===
Thoroughgood was converted as a Christian believer in 1956 under the ministries of the late Pastor Joseph Rome Spence and Elder John Thoroughgood. He received the Baptism in the Holy Ghost as a Pentecostal in 1960 and was licensed as a minister in 1966. The late Bishop David C. Love, the Bishop of the First Jurisdiction of Virginia, ordained him an Elder in the Church of God in Christ in 1968. In 1970, Bishop Thoroughgood founded the New Jerusalem Church of God in Christ with two members, now currently a 1,000 member church in Southeastern Virginia Beach in the historic African-American Seatack community and was officially appointed pastor by Bishop David C. Love in 1972. In 1973, New Jerusalem moved from the Virginia First Jurisdiction to the Virginia Second Jurisdiction under the leadership of Bishop Samuel L. Green, Jr. Bishop Thoroughgood was appointed District Superintendent of the Virginia Beach District of the Church of God in Christ, Virginia Second Jurisdiction, in August 1973.

In 1978, Thoroughgood was appointed to serve as a National Adjutant for then-Presiding Bishop J.O. Patterson, Sr. and was later appointed by the Bishop J. Delano Ellis as a Divisional Overseer. In 1990, he was appointed Assistant Chief Adjutant by the Bishop H. J. Bell and in 1997 was appointed Assistant Adjutant General by then-Presiding Bishop Chandler D. Owens. He was later appointed by the former Presiding Bishop C. D. Owens as Adjutant General, July 2000. He was elevated to the Office of Adjutant Bishop and Adjutant General on September 15, 2001, by Bishop Gilbert E. Patterson.

Thoroughgood was very well known for his baritone voice and his very exuberant and charismatic style of preaching, which attracted many people to his church, New Jerusalem COGIC, in Virginia Beach, including native Virginia celebrities like Pharrell Williams, Timbaland and Missy Elliott (Portsmouth). Timbaland and several members of his family considered themselves "honorary members" of his church.

=== Public Service ===
Thoroughgood was renowned for his Christian public service and missions work he did through his local church for the historic African American community, Seatack, Virginia, where New Jerusalem is located. He and his church partnered with numerous other local pastors and churches in Virginia, including Bishop Ted Thomas, Sr., Bishop Courtney Macbeth, and Bishop Levi Willis, Sr. and Willis, Jr., and Bishop Samuel L. Green, Jr. on various occasion to organize many community service initiatives and events throughout Seatack to help raise funds for local charities and in 2001 to build a multipurpose help center to reach out to the poor and homeless of the Seatack community. He also partnered with Timbaland on various occasion throughout 2001 to 2008 to help organize special dinners and cookouts for the Seatack community, held at his church, especially on Labor Day, to help give out school supplies to local Seatack children, feed the homeless, and provide general community service opportunities to adults and children throughout the Seatack community. His church, New Jerusalem COGIC, still continues to annually host a "Labor Day Picnic and Cookout." Timbaland also, in turn, donated to his ministries to help him renovate his church and expand the church edifice into the large church building that it is today. He also used much of the funds donated to his church to help partner with local Virginia nonprofit affordable housing and philanthropy organizations such as Habitats for Humanity to help build homes for the homeless of the Seatack local community, and allowed the church to provide for the finances of the housing until they were paid off.

Nationally with the COGIC denomination, Thoroughgood also served as National Regional Representative for Area Eight for the COGIC International Missions Department. He served as Chairman of Special Projects and Sponsorship for the Church of God in Christ Orphanage for Girls in Port-au-Prince, Haiti in the West Indies, with which he dedicated much international community service work and leadership to the development of the orphanage.

Thoroughgood also served as a member of the Virginia Beach Clergy Association and the Virginia Beach Ministerial Alliance. He was the founding bishop of the Hampton Roads Ecumenical Council of Bishops. He was very active in the community as evident by the following awards: the Regional Postmaster General for the National Postal Forum East; American Legion’s Distinguished Achievement Award; United Counsel of Citizens and Civic Leagues Award for Meritorious Services; Church Of God In Christ Religious Worker’s Guild Inc. special achievement Award; Virginia Beach Planning Commission for Distinguished and Faithful Services; South Eastern Tidewater Opportunity Project’s Black and White Award for Outstanding Service to the Humanities; Congressional Recognition for outstanding invaluable service to the community, the United States Congress; Coalition of Minority Civic Leagues Black History Maker of Virginia; and many other resolutions, Certificates, Trophies, Awards and proclamations for outstanding services to the City of Virginia Beach.

=== Death ===
Thoroughgood suffered from cardiovascular disease in the later part of his life. He died from a heart attack, as an indirect cause of congestive heart failure, on February 5, 2012, while preaching in the pulpit of his local church New Jerusalem. A Two-Day (Local/Jurisdiction and National) Homegoing and Funeral Celebration was held for him at the New Jerusalem COGIC and at the Virginia Beach Convention Center. The eulogy at the local service was delivered by the late Bishop Samuel L. Green, Jr. at New Jerusalem. The eulogy at the National Homegoing service was preached by Bishop Charles E. Blake, the Presiding Bishop of the Church of God in Christ at the Virginia Beach Convention Center. Many local and state political officials attended both homegoing services including Scott Riggell, Will Sessoms, former Virginia governor Bob McDonnell, and late Virginia Beach Mayor Meyera E. Oberndorf.

Thoroughgood was succeeded as Adjutant General of COGIC by Bishop Matthew Williams of Orlando, Florida, and was succeeded by his nephew who was also a COGIC Minister and Pastor, Elder Adam L. Thourogood, Sr. as the Pastor of New Jerusalem. Pastor Adam Thourogood later died on April 21, 2015, in a tragic accident on a tractor on an industrial farm in rural Suffolk, Virginia, where he had worked for several years. He was succeeded by Bishop Barnett Thoroughgood's brother, Superintendent YD Thoroughgood, who was the current pastor of New Jerusalem, until his death on June 9, 2018. The current pastor of the church is one of his nephews, Pastor Waddee B. Thoroughgood, Jr., the son of the above mentioned Pastor YD Thoroughgood.
