= Bygdøy Church =

Coordinates: 59°54′22.3″N 10°40′44″E

- Bygdøy kirke
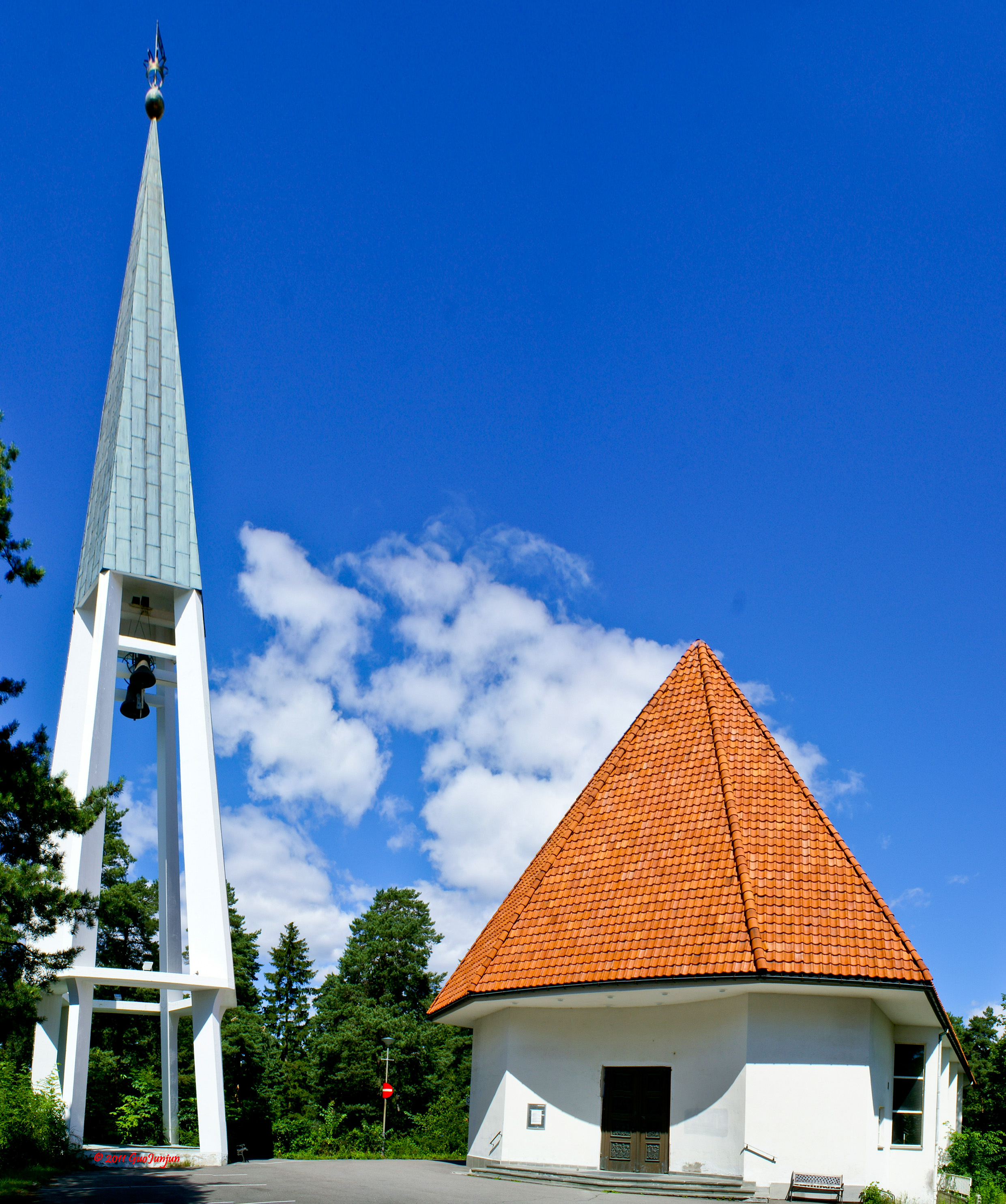

- Location in Oslo Bygdøy Church (Norway)
- Location: Strømsborgveien 12, Bygdøy, Oslo
- Country: Norway
- Denomination: Church of Norway
- Churchmanship: Evangelical Lutheran

History
- Status: Parish church

Architecture
- Functional status: Active
- Architect: Finn Bryn
- Completed: 1968

Specifications
- Capacity: 200
- Materials: Concrete

Administration
- Diocese: Diocese of Oslo
- Deanery: Oslo arch-deanery

Bygdøy Church (Norwegian: Bygdøy kirke) is a church that was built in a fan plan in 1968 on the peninsula of Bygdøy in Oslo, Norway. It replaced the Bygdøy chapel, which burned ten years earlier.

The church, which is located on a hill, is made of white painted concrete and has large sloping ceilings and a separate bell tower with two church bells, created by Olsen Nauen Bell Foundry. The number of seats is about 200. The building contains also a sacristy, baptistry lounge and kitchen in the basement. The church was designed by architect Finn Bryn.

The altarpiece is a glass mosaic with metal and a gold-plated field created by Veslemøy Nystedt Stoltenberg in 1995. There is a large cross that is made of brass with turquoise, molded pieces of vitreous enamel at the side wall. The pulpit and the baptismal font are designed by the architect. The church has a church organ with 15 voices. To the west are copper doors with reliefs, created by Ørnulf Bast.

The church is listed and protected by law by the Norwegian Directorate for Cultural Heritage.

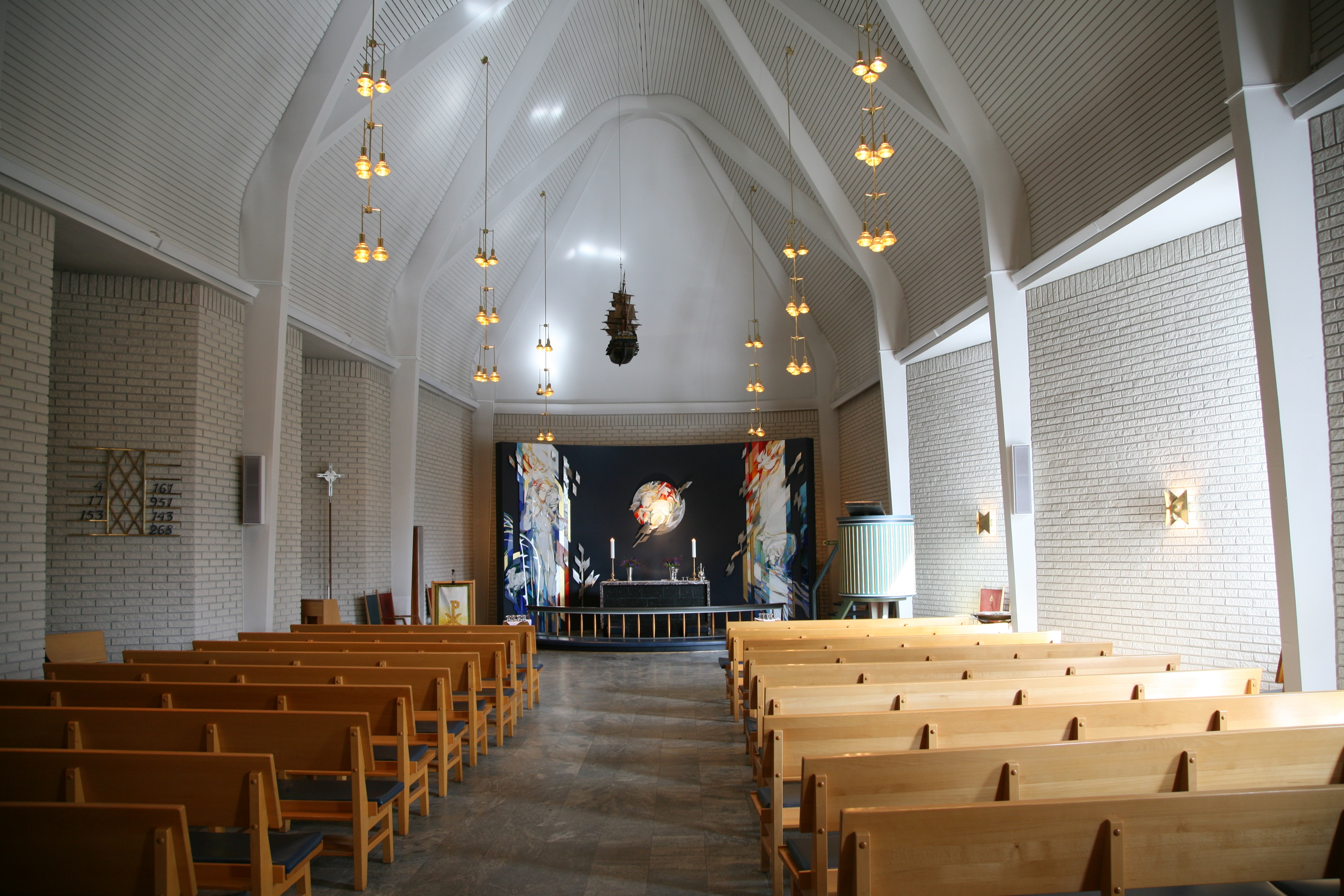
Interior

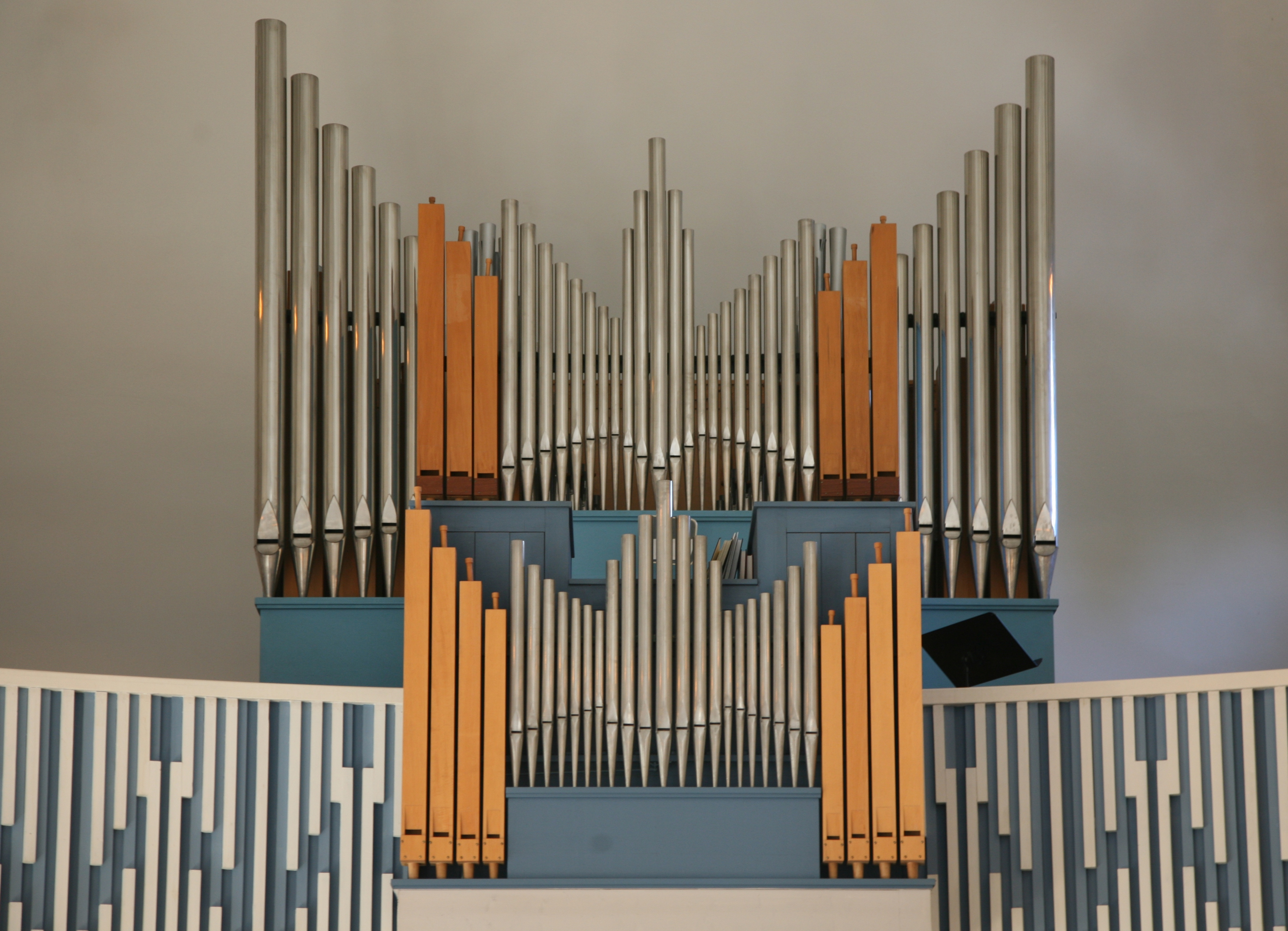
The church organ
