= Military Sea Services Museum =

Military museum in Sebring, Florida

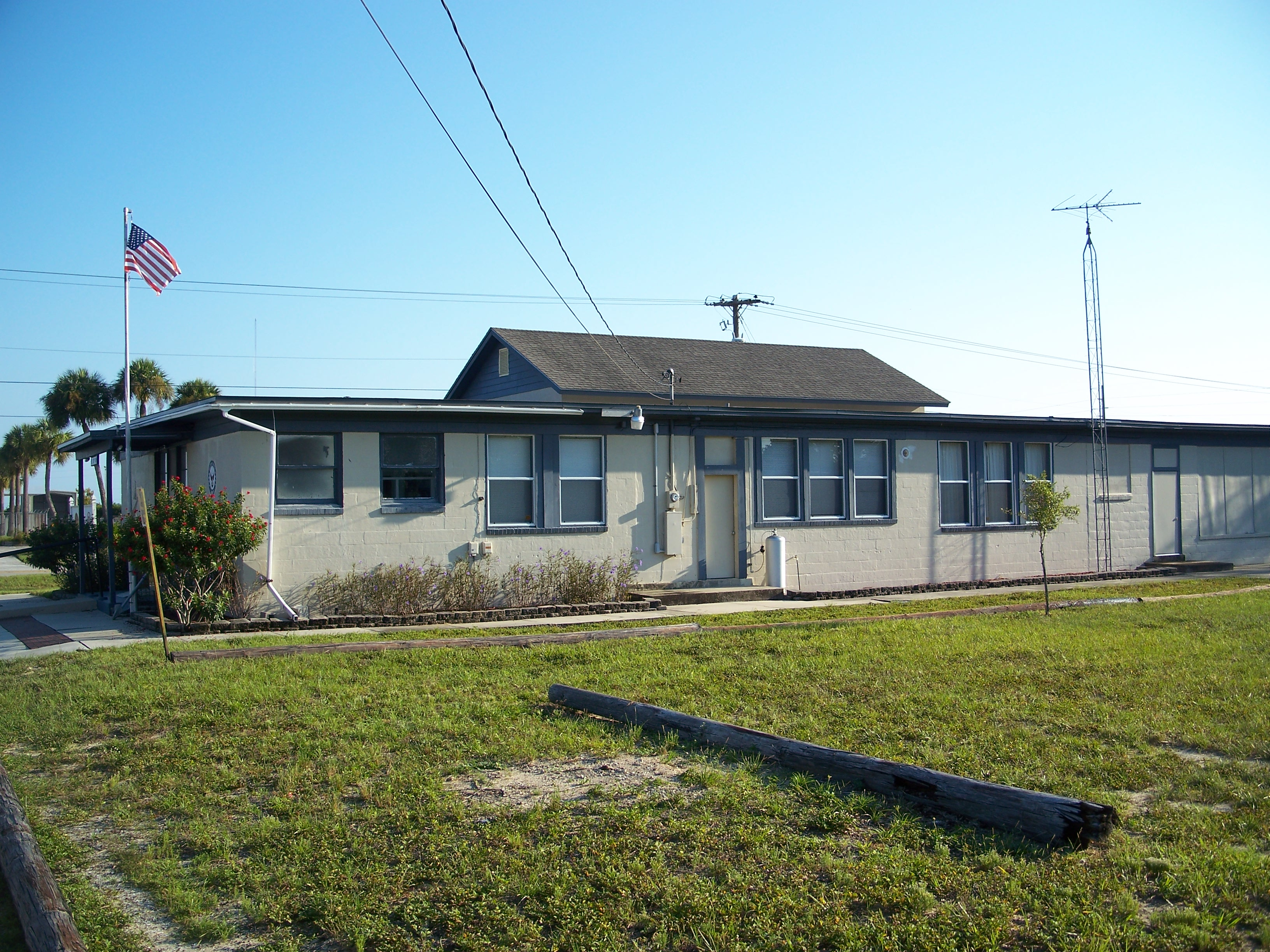

- Location within Florida
- Established: 1998
- Location: 1402 Roseland Avenue; Sebring, Florida
- Coordinates: 27.485303°N 81.418599°W
- Type: Military
- Website: Military Sea Services Museum

The Military Sea Services Museum, located at 1402 Roseland Avenue, Sebring, Florida, developed from the ideas of the members of Branch 173 of the Fleet Reserve Association (FRA). The members discussed "displaying their memorabilia to 'dress up' the building and promote the military sea services.". The museum was established in 1998, with the "Grand Opening" occurring on Memorial Day, and contains artifacts and exhibits relating to the U.S. Coast Guard, U.S. Marines and U.S. Navy, including state flags, posters, military items, and sea services memorabilia.

The museum became a non-profit Florida Corporation in September 2000 only to experience extensive damage in 2004 from Hurricane Jeanne. In April 2005, a contractor rebuilt most of the museum, which included a new addition, the "USS Highland Room". The new "Grand Opening" occurred in August 2005.

== Photo gallery ==
See footnote

== See also ==
- Coast Guard Museum Northwest
- Virginia Beach Surf & Rescue Museum
- Port Orford Lifeboat Station Museum
- Sleeping Bear Point Coast Guard Station Maritime Museum
- U.S. Navy Museum
- National Museum of the Marine Corps
