= Norwegian Lady Statues =

Statues in Norway and the United States

Coordinates: 36.853593°N 75.975815°W

The Norwegian Lady Statues are located in the sister cities of Moss, a coastal town and municipality in the county of Østfold, Norway, and at the Oceanfront (boardwalk) in the coastal resort city of Virginia Beach, Virginia in the United States. They commemorate the lives lost in the 1891 shipwreck of the Norwegian barque Dictator off the coast of Virginia Beach and the lifesaving efforts of the community.

== Wreck of the Dictator ==
On Good Friday, March 27, 1891, the Norwegian barque Dictator, whose home port was the coastal town of Moss, Norway, was lost in the Atlantic Ocean south of the mouth of the Chesapeake Bay off Virginia Beach, Virginia. The Dictator had a crew of 15 and the captain's family aboard. The sailing ship had been en route to West Hartlepool, England from Pensacola, Florida with a cargo of Georgia Pine lumber. After being caught and disabled in several storms along the East Coast of the United States, she was headed up the coast for port at Hampton Roads at Norfolk, Virginia to make repairs when she encountered gale force winds.

Just a few miles south of Cape Henry, and the comparative shelter of the Chesapeake Bay, the sailing ship was driven aground on a sandbar over 300 yards (300 m) offshore of Virginia Beach near present-day 37th street. Her only two lifeboats were destroyed as the main mast and other rigging fell onto the deck. As the vacationing guests of the Princess Anne Hotel and area residents of the small new resort town watched, members from Seatack and Cape Henry Lifesaving Stations of the United States Lifesaving Service (a predecessor agency of the United States Coast Guard) worked in the high winds and seas at rescue efforts beginning about 10:45 A.M.

Combined with efforts of the ship's crew, 8 of the 17 persons aboard were saved using several methods including a breeches buoy before it was too dark to continue. Johanne Jørgensen, the pregnant young wife of Captain Jørgen M. Jørgensen, and their 4-year-old son Carl Zealand Jørgensen, were among those who drowned in a final escape attempt as the ship broke up. One more sailor survived, but five other sailors were also drowned. The Captain was somehow spared and washed ashore semi-conscious, but still alive.

Captain Jørgensen and the 9 surviving members of his crew were taken to Norfolk. They were aided by the Norwegian Consul and various religious and benevolent shipping groups. All but one of those drowned were buried in Norfolk's Elmwood Cemetery. The remaining sailor, whose body washed ashore a few days later after the wreck, was interred at a local cemetery near the Oceanfront.

In those days, the tragic shipwreck of the Dictator (and the resulting loss of life) was not an unusual event for the local citizenry in this northernmost area of the Graveyard of the Atlantic. The treacherous waters in the area extend south along the North Carolina coast and had claimed many hundreds of vessels. However, as an impromptu memorial was erected shortly thereafter, the story of the Dictator and the souls aboard her would become part of both local tradition and legend in coastal Princess Anne County and Virginia Beach.

== Ship's figurehead: Norwegian Lady memorial ==
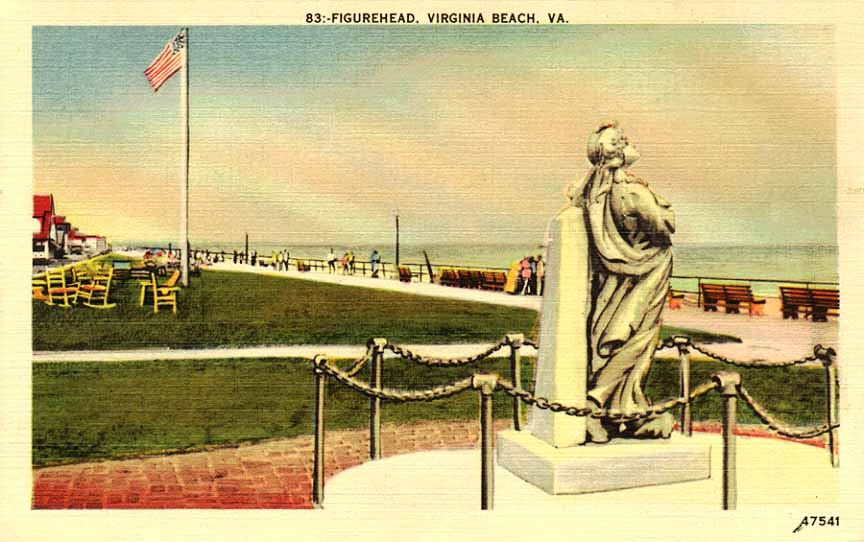
1918 postcard of original Norwegian Lady Figurehead Memorial at Virginia Beach, Virginia

Since early days of navigation, a ship's figurehead had often been a feature intended in some way to help ensure a safe and prosperous voyage. After the breakup and sinking of the Dictator, the ship's wooden female figurehead had washed ashore nearby. Spotted by a young guest, it was retrieved by the manager of the Princess Anne Hotel. He subsequently had it placed in a vertical position facing the ocean near the boardwalk as a memorial to those who lost their lives in the shipwreck. Known as the "Norwegian Lady", it was a landmark at Virginia Beach's Boardwalk at 16th street for more than 60 years as the town became incorporated in 1906 and grew to become a small city in 1923.

In the brutal coastal weather, the figurehead gradually became weathered and eroded. Then, during Hurricane Barbara in 1953, it was significantly damaged and was removed to a city-owned building for safe-keeping. Subsequently, a few years later, city officials could not locate it, speculating that it had been stolen, or destroyed by accident. Figureheads had long-since been discontinued as a feature of most ships, but the Norwegian Lady had become more than a mere ship's figurehead to the people of Virginia Beach; she was a memorial and a community icon.

== New statues for sister cities ==
As the story of the lost memorial grew in Virginia Beach, community interest spread across the ocean to Moss. A drive began at both ends to replace the memorial. With a substantial contribution of the Norwegian Shipping Association, enough funds were raised to pay for not just a replacement for Virginia Beach, but two new statues.

Norwegian sculptor Ørnulf Bast was commissioned to create two nine-foot bronze replicas of the original figurehead. The Norwegian Lady statues were unveiled on September 22, 1962. One was presented as a gift to Virginia Beach, and an exact duplicate was erected in Moss, Norway to unite the two cities. Each statue gives the appearance of facing the other across the Atlantic Ocean (but in reality, the directions of their respective gazes are almost perpendicular to each other).

Moss and Virginia Beach officially became sister cities in 1974. Every year on the anniversary of the wreck, the Ladies Auxiliary of the Virginia Beach Volunteer Fire Department places a wreath at the base of the statue there. On October 13, 1995, during a state visit, Her Majesty Queen Sonja of Norway visited the Norwegian Lady statue in Virginia Beach, and placed memorial flowers.

The statue in Moss receives similar honors. Virginia Beach officials have traveled to Moss, and paid similar respects to the "other" Norwegian Lady.

On the pedestal of the Virginia Beach statue, these words are inscribed:

I am the Norwegian Lady. I stand here, as my sister before me, to wish all men of the sea safe return home.
