= Coast Guard Museum Northwest =

Museum in Seattle, Washington, US

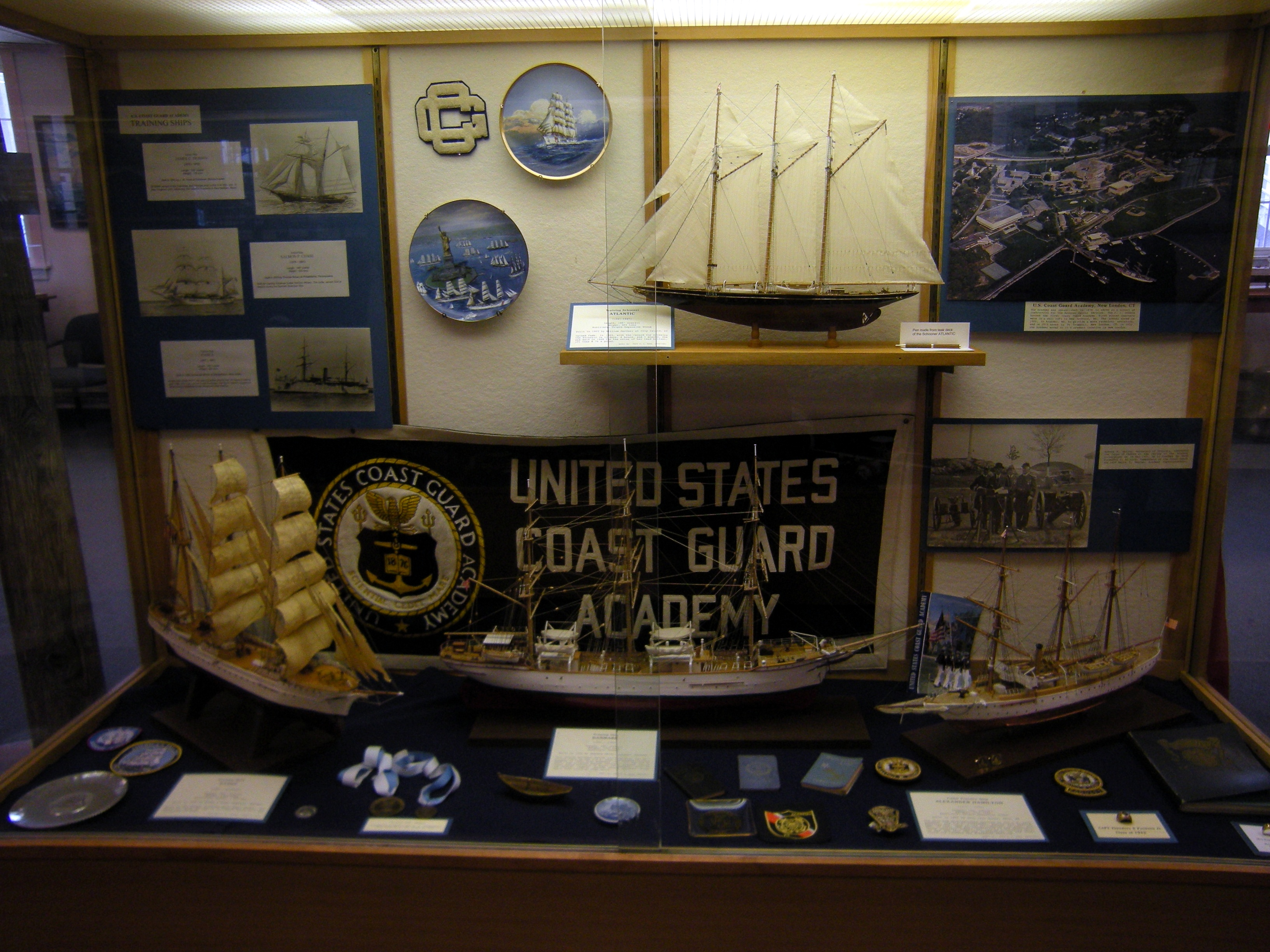
- Established: 1988
- Location: 1519 Alaskan Way South; Seattle, Washington
- Coordinates: 47.5906°N 122.3377°W
- Type: Coast guard
- Website: Coast Guard Museum Northwest

The Coast Guard Museum Northwest (sometimes written as Coast Guard Museum/Northwest) is dedicated to preserving the heritage of the United States Coast Guard in the Pacific Northwest. The museum is located on the property of Coast Guard Station Seattle on the Elliott Bay waterfront south of Downtown, Seattle, Washington. It covers the full range of Coast Guard roles, ranging from protecting shores, lives and property to lighthouses and lightships, from life-saving stations to rescue boats, from buoy tenders to icebreakers and weather ships and from modern aircraft to patrol boats and cutters. The museum admittance is free of charge.

== History ==
Coast Guard Museum Northwest houses thousands of artifacts and a library with over 3,000 books and periodicals about U.S. Coast Guard and Pacific Northwest maritime history, over 2,500 historical documents, clippings and vessel plans, and over 15,000 photographs. Among the exhibits are numerous detailed ship models, portions of historic ships, Coast Guard uniforms, lenses from lighthouses and buoys, and the Coast Guard flag carried on the first Space Shuttle flight.

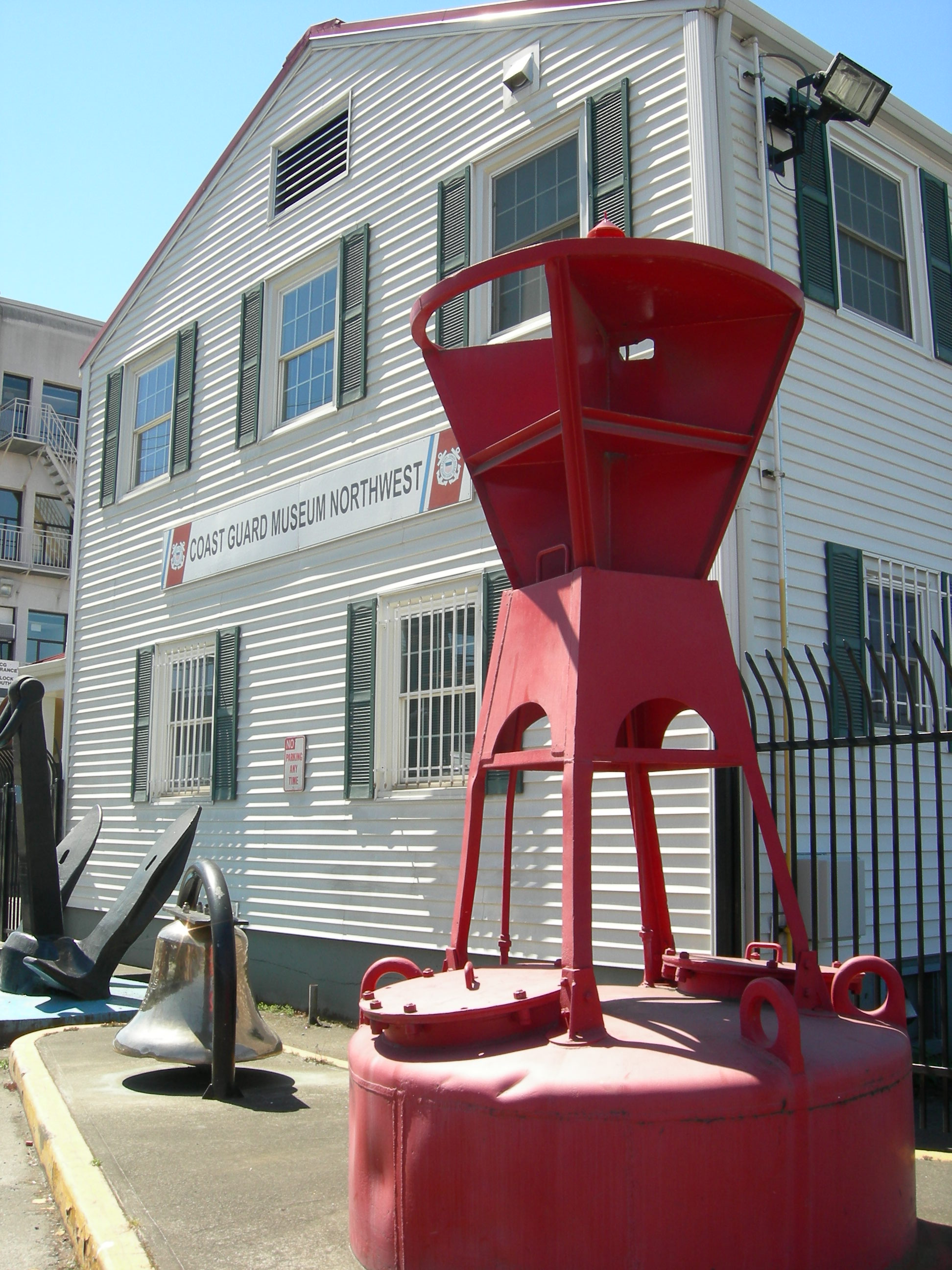
Coast Guard Museum Northwest (2007)

== Collections ==
Besides ship models, some of the numerous artifacts on display include:

- A United States Lighthouse Service clock, circa 1860
- Ship's wheels, binnacles, etc.
- Pieces of HMS Bounty and "Old Ironsides" (the USS Constitution)
- The ship's bell from the steam tug Roosevelt, Admiral Robert Peary's ship during his quest for the North Pole
- A United States Revenue Cutter Service ensign from Captain "Hell-Roarin" Mike Healy's Bear, circa 1900
- The sextant from the German U-boat U-873 captured by the Coast Guard-staffed USS Durant during World War II
- Items from the German trawler Externsteine captured by the icebreaker Eastwind off Greenland during World War II
- The largest public collection of Coast Guard patches

== Other Coast Guard museums ==
- Virginia Beach Surf & Rescue Museum
- Port Orford Lifeboat Station Museum
- Sleeping Bear Point Coast Guard Station Maritime Museum
- USCGC Tamaroa (WMEC-166) (museum ship)
- USCGC Mackinaw (WAGB-83) (museum ship)
- The Coast Guard Heritage Museum at the United States Customshouse in Barstable, Massachusetts

== See also ==
- Military Sea Services Museum
