= Ørnulf Bast =

Norwegian sculptor and painter

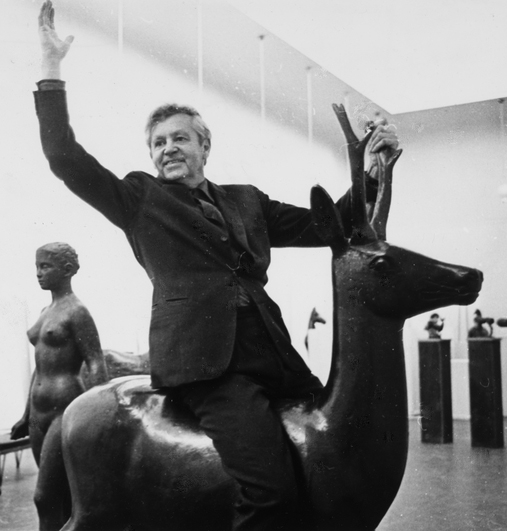
- Bast in 1968
- Born: Ørnulf Bjarne Bast; 25 January 1905; Oslo, Norway
- Died: 28 October 1974 (aged 69)
- Education: Norwegian National Academy of Fine Arts
- Spouse: Lajla von Hanno (m. 1940)

Ørnulf Bast (25 January 1907 – 28 October 1974) was a Norwegian sculptor and painter particularly known for his public monuments.

== Biography ==
Ørnulf Bjarne Bast was born in Oslo. His parents were Halsten Andersen Bast Birklund (1870–1952) and Ida Mathilde Kristensen (1870–1960). Bast studied at the Norwegian National Academy of Fine Arts (Norwegian: Statens kunstakademi) from 1927 to 1930. He made several study trips, first to France from 1928 to 1929 and later to Britain, Germany, Greece, Italy, Spain and North Africa, including Egypt, 1930 and 1932, and a new journey to Paris 1937.

In 1940, Bast married Lajla von Hanno (1921–2010). During the occupation of Norway by Nazi Germany, he and his wife supplied a cover-up apartment for the Norwegian resistance movement, specifically for the staff of the sabotage squad Aks 13000, for some time. From 1947 until his death in 1974, Bast had a permanent residence in the summer at Fuglevik ved Rakke in Brunlanes Municipality, south of Larvik, where he also had his studio. Ørnulf Bast was awarded the King's Medal of Merit (Kongens fortjenstmedalje) in gold.

== Career ==
He completed a wide range of public memorials and decorations in a quiet style, characterized by a French-dominated class flight of sculptural tradition. Of note are Borregaard-monumentet in Sarpsborg (1937), St. Hallvards brønn in Bragernes square in Drammen (1940–1952), Tvillingsøstrene (1947–1949) in Copenhagen, Evig liv (1948–1949) at Sehesteds plass in Oslo and Ung kvinne (1946–1947) at St. Hanshaugen Park in Oslo, and Kongens Nei (1949–1950) in Elverum.

Among his works were the identical bronze statues titles The Norwegian Lady dedicated in 1962, which were placed in Moss, Norway and Virginia Beach, Virginia facing each other across the ocean. The statues were modeled after the figurehead of the Norwegian bark Dictator, home ported in Moss, which foundered and sank in the Graveyard of the Atlantic off the coast of Virginia Beach on 27–28 March 1891. Despite substantial lifesaving efforts from shore, seven people died, including the captain's pregnant wife and four-year-old son. The new statues re-established old ties between the two communities, and in 1974, they became sister cities. Annual events are held at the Bast statues.

== Selected works ==
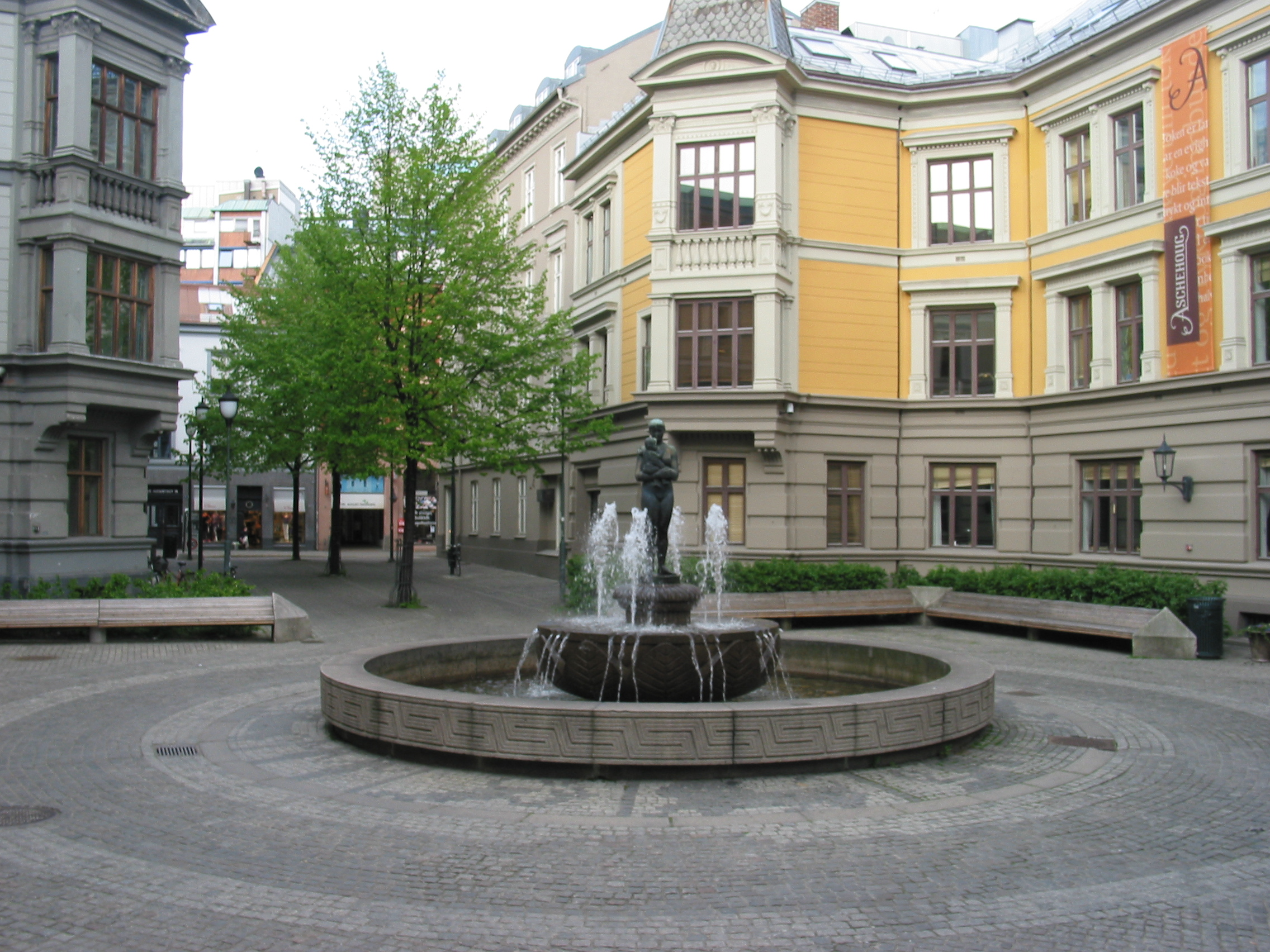
Evig liv (1948-1949) sculpture by Bast at Sehesteds plass

- Bronseløver, 1930–31
- Borregaard-monumentet, 1936–39
- St. Hallvards brønn, 1940–52
- Ung kvinne, 1946–47
- Tvillingsøstrene, 1947–49
- Evig liv, 1947–49
- Stavernpiken, 1948–49
- Kongens Nei, 1949–50
- Fole, 1953,
- Kristian Birkeland, 1960
- The Norwegian Lady, 1962
- Herman Wildenvey, 1965–67
- Metamorfose av Nike fra Samothrake, 1966–67
- Skogsarbeideren, 1967–68
- Haakon VII, 1969
- Einar Skjæraasen-monument, 1970
- Pike med fugl, 1977
