= Joshua Kelley (sailor) =

Drag performer and US Navy sailor (born 1990s)

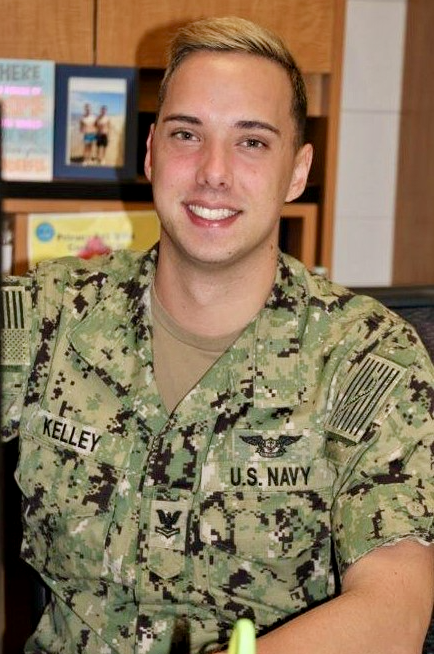
- YN2 Kelley in June 2020
- Born: Joshua J. Kelley; 1993/1994 (age 32–33)
- Other name: Harpy Daniels
- Occupations: Drag queen; sailor
- Military career
- Branch: United States Navy
- Years: 2016–present (10.7 years)
- Rank: Petty officer first class
- Units: VFA-115 (Ronald Reagan); NSWCDD, Dam Neck Annex; USS Bulkeley
- Known for: Drag performing

Joshua J. Kelley (born 1993/1994) is a drag queen and United States Navy sailor.

== Personal life ==
Joshua J. Kelley was born in 1993 or 1994 as one of two twin boys, and grew up in Berwick, Pennsylvania. In 2018, their father was a Navy counselor, a senior chief petty officer with 24 years military service.

A fan of RuPaul's Drag Race in their teens, Kelley began pursuing drag as their passion after seeing a drag show at Bloomsburg University of Pennsylvania in 2013. Kelley's drag persona is named Harpy Daniels (named for their favorite animal, the harpy eagle), who was named Miss Gay Harrisburg's pageant queen in 2015. In 2020, Kelley identified as a gay man, but was reportedly identifying as non-binary by 2023.

== Navy ==
Kelley joined the United States Navy in February 2016 for the financial stability afforded by the military. They became a yeoman. Their first assignment was with VFA-115 aboard USS Ronald Reagan, with a stint in Yokosuka, Japan. In June 2020, they were stationed at Naval Surface Warfare Center Dahlgren Division's Dam Neck Annex as a petty officer second class. As of July 2025, they were a petty officer first class assigned to USS Bulkeley at Naval Station Rota, Spain.

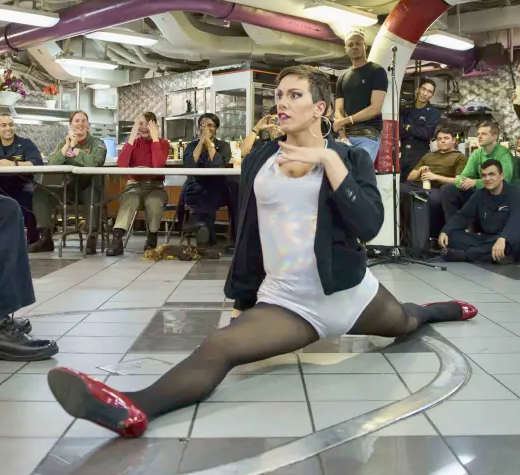
Kelley performing as Harpy Daniels aboard Ronald Reagan (Nov 2017)

In their first two years, they were named VFA-115's Blue Jacket of the Year and voted their president for Coalition of Sailors Against Destructive Decisions; they became the public affairs officer for Reagan's Gay, Lesbian and Supporting Sailors; and received their first Navy and Marine Corps Achievement Medal. They also perform as Harpy Daniels while serving in the Navy: Morale, Welfare and Recreation has sponsored Daniels performances, and they won second place in a 2017 lip sync competition, earning a Navy Exchange gift card for US$1,000 (equivalent to $1,313 in 2025).

Despite the US military's history with LGBT members (including don't ask, don't tell), Kelley said in 2018 that—in their experience—all that mattered was whether a sailor could do their job: "that's what it comes down to in the Navy. No one tells me I'm too feminine. I've not once had a bad experience as a gay man in the military".

=== Digital ambassador ===
When, from October 2022 to March 2023, the Navy piloted a program "designed to explore the digital environment to reach a wide range of potential candidates" in an effort to recruit more sailors, YN2 Kelley was one of five active sailors named a digital ambassador; they used their inclusive platform to promote their positive experiences in the Navy as an LGBT enlistee and drag queen.

Two months after the program ended, Libs of TikTok republished a video of an old Harpy Daniels performance, leading right-wing extremists to publish abusive material about and directed at the active-duty sailor. Robert J. O'Neill, a former Navy SEAL, criticized the Navy's alleged unreadiness to combat China because of Kelley's participation in the program, saying, "I can't believe I fought for this bullshit." In their letter to the Naval Inspector General (and deputy), the Chief of Naval Operations, and the Secretary of the Navy, America First Legal requested an investigation into Kelley's alleged violations of the Uniform Code of Military Justice for using social media to support Democratic candidates and express "public disdain for [Donald] Trump".

Contemporaneously, a group of Republican senators (including Marco Rubio) wrote to the Secretary of the Navy, Carlos Del Toro, and requested he justify why the Navy partnered with Kelley, whom they alleged "promoted the use of Chinese-owned social media and inappropriately represented the service [with] behaviors and activities many Americans deem inappropriate."

This begs the question whether the Navy endorses the personal posts of its influencers and 'ambassadors.' If so, does the Navy endorse drag shows? Where does the Navy draw the line on promotion of the personal activities of its influencers? Would the Navy enlist burlesque dancers or exotic dancers to reach possible recruits? [...] Such activity is not appropriate for promotion in a professional workplace or the United States military.
