= False Cape State Park =

State park in Virginia, United States

- IUCN category IV (habitat/species management area)
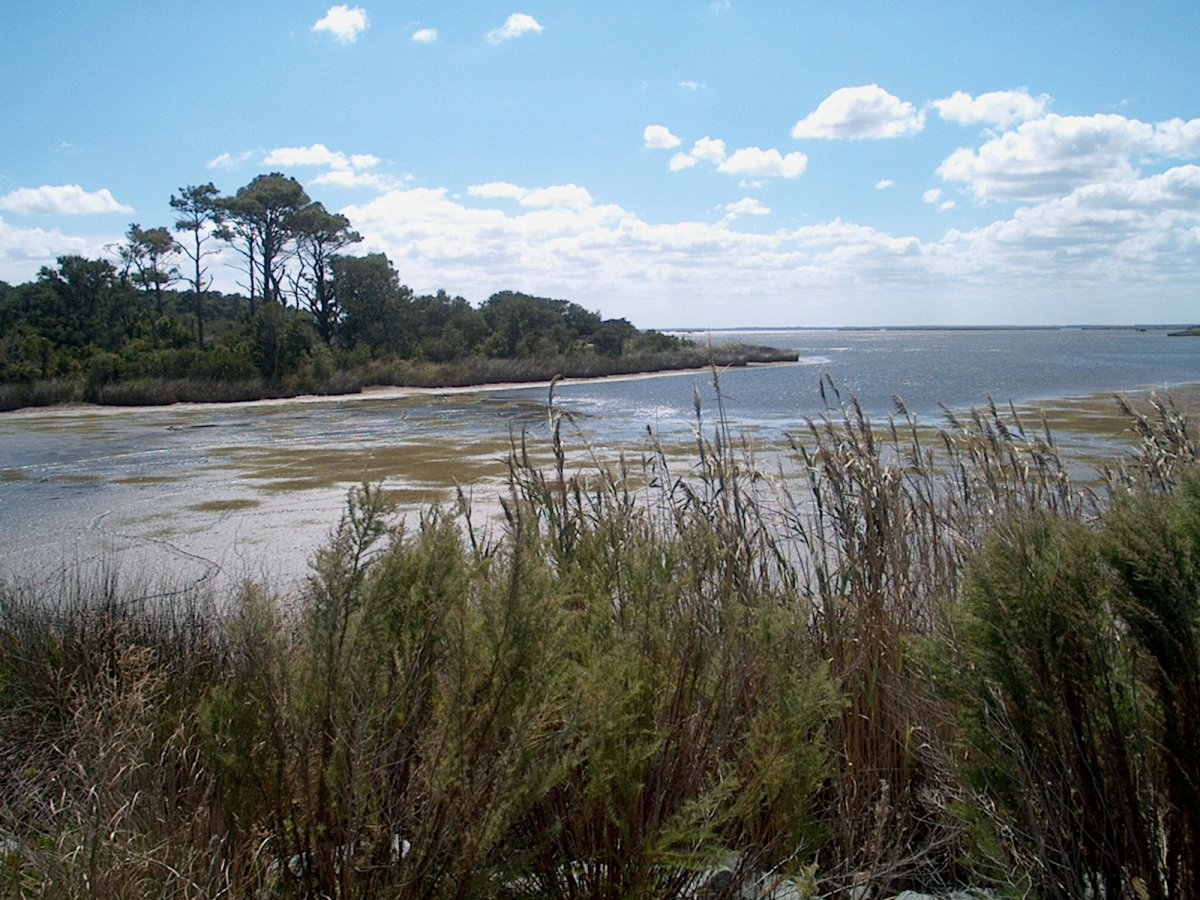

- Location within Virginia
- Location: Virginia, United States
- Nearest city: Virginia Beach, Virginia
- Coordinates: 36°35′16″N 75°53′3″W
- Area: 4,321 acres (17.49 km^{2})
- Established: 1968
- Governing body: Virginia Department of Conservation and Recreation

False Cape State Park is a 4,321-acre (17.49 km^{2}) state park located on the Currituck Banks Peninsula, but within the city of Virginia Beach, from Back Bay National Wildlife Refuge to the state border with North Carolina. Access is generally by foot or bicycle through the wildlife refuge from Virginia, or by boat or canoe from either the bayside or Atlantic shoreline. The park and former Wash Woods community therein gained their respective names because some mariners mistakenly believed it a barrier island near Cape Henry and the Chesapeake Bay further north (or to the now-landlocked Currituck Sound or ocean-accessible Albemarle Sound much further south). Some would run aground, particularly in severe weather, then their cargo washed ashore. The Currituck Banks Peninsula is a one-mile-wide (1.6 km) sandy spit between the Back Bay of the Currituck Sound and the Atlantic Ocean, and just north of Mackay Island National Wildlife Refuge in North Carolina.

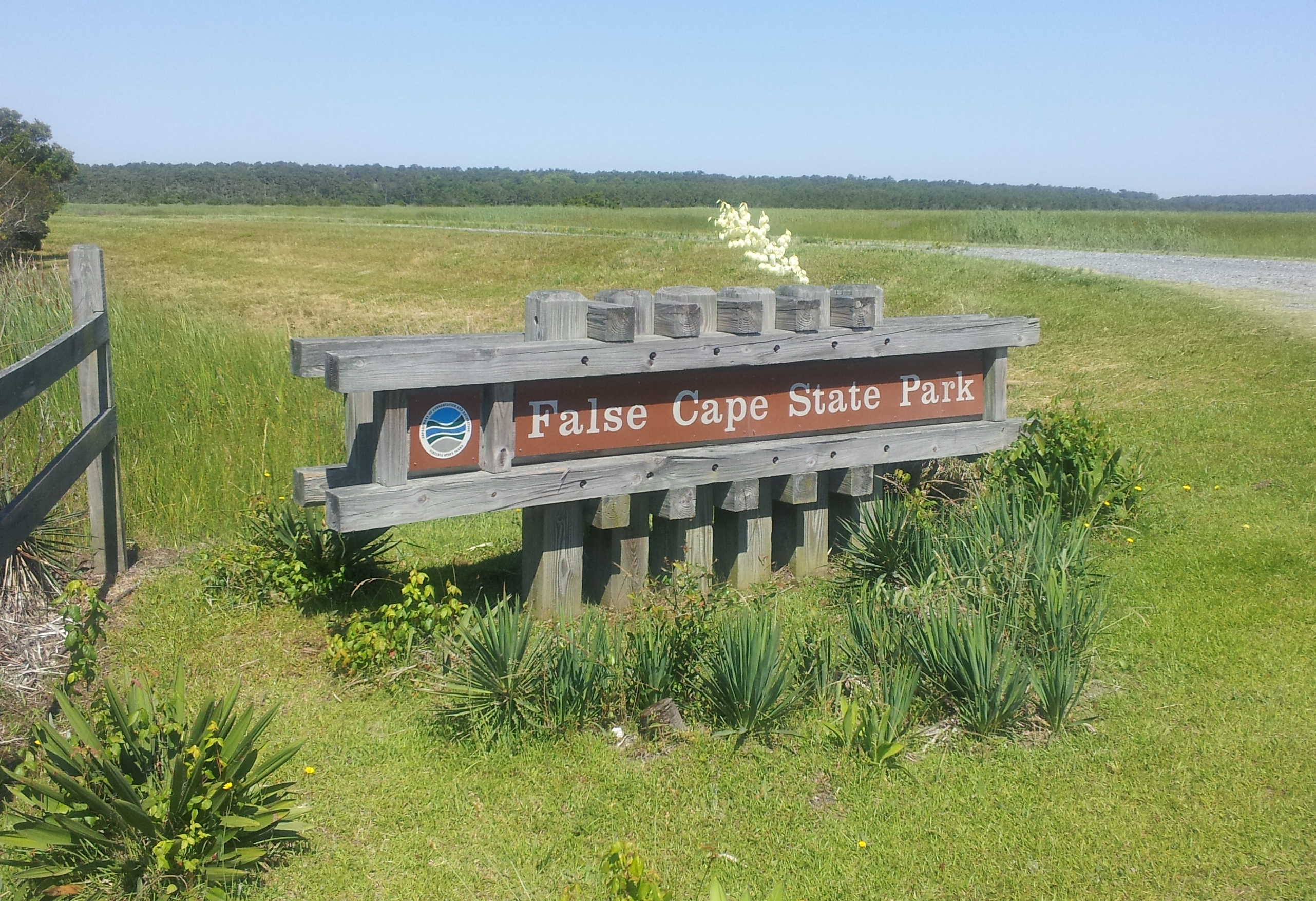
False Cape State Park Entrance

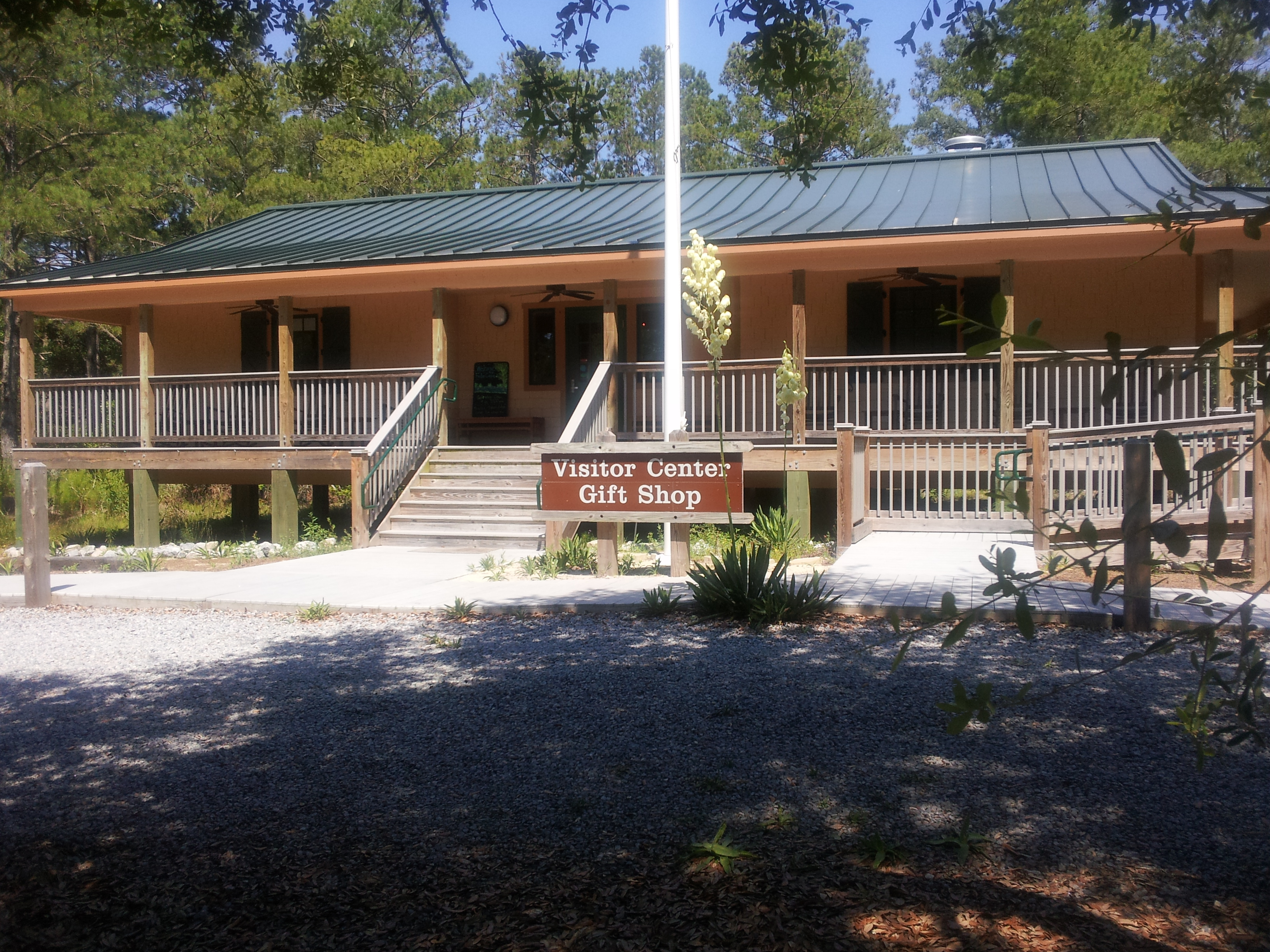
False Cape State Park Visitor Center

== History ==
This area of the Atlantic coast is sometimes nicknamed the Graveyard of the Atlantic because of shifting sandbars in the shallow waters, as well as treacherous shoals and severe and sudden weather changes that menace mariners. The low-lying shrubs and sand of this peninsula from a distance are easily mistaken for Cape Henry, which lies about 20 miles (32 km) to the north at the mouth of the Chesapeake Bay. Ships and boats looking to enter Chesapeake Bay to the north or Albemarle Sound to the south, or blown off course by gales or hurricanes, could easily run aground.

In the 17th or 18th centuries, shipwreck survivors developed the now abandoned community of Wash Woods. Residents supported themselves by fishing, farming or salvage operations. Later occupations also included hunting guides and rescue boat crewmen. The village's church and other structures were built using cypress wood that washed ashore from wrecks. The United States Life-Saving Service, founded in 1878 (which in 1915 merged into the United States Coast Guard), had four stations at six-mile intervals between Cape Henry and Little Island. In the early 20th century, several hunt clubs built lodges in what became the park, to take advantage of the area's abundant waterfowl. The small community that surrounded the Little Island station was completely destroyed by a tropical hurricane on August 25, 1933. During the Great Depression, the Civilian Conservation Corps completed several flood control projects in what became the Back Bay National Wildlife Refuge. The Wash Woods Environmental Education Center is a converted hunt clubhouse.

At the south end of False Cape is a monument with "Va." on one side and "N Ca" on the other. Although it reads "A.D. 1728" on the top, it was more likely erected in 1887 when the boundary was surveyed again, since the original marker was a simple cedar post. "A.D. 1728" refers to the year William Byrd II and Virginia and North Carolina officials directed the first survey of the current boundary.

One of the earliest documented shipwrecks in the area occurred in January 1738, when a ship from Plymouth, England carrying about 300 potential Protestant colonists from Switzerland wrecked. Accounts differ as to whether about 60 or 80 survived, but frozen bodies were recovered for many miles along the coast and in salt marshes near the Lynnhaven River (central Virginia Beach). Their leader, John Ochs (whose fate is not recorded), had corresponded with Byrd about settling his followers on the land near the Roanoke River (to the west) which Byrd had received in compensation for that survey.

In June 1942, a German Type IX U-boat briefly surfaced off False Cape and landed two Abwehr agents. A missing canister of marked Chesapeake Bay charts was recovered but the landing party vanished. The incident remained classified until the 1990s.

Undeveloped portions of the park were dedicated as the False Cape Natural Area Preserve in 2002.

== Facilities and access issues ==
The park features hiking and biking trails. Its visitors' center has historical exhibits and a store, as well as water and restrooms. A former hunting lodge is now an environmental education center. Primitive campsites are available but often fully reserved May through October. However, it has no campsites suitable for recreational vehicles, which cannot access the park, but can access First Landing State Park at the northern end of Virginia Beach, or Kiptopeke State Park at Cape Charles across Chesapeake Bay. Certain tour buses (schedule link at park website and reservations required) can access the park through Back Bay National Wildlife Refuge. North Carolina currently permits oceanfront vehicle access, but vehicles which authorities deem likely to get stuck in the sand (especially recreational vehicles) may be turned back. Limited beach vehicular access remains for grandfathered permit holders. Some groups have advocated further restrictions on vehicle access by dune buggies, sport utility vehicle and balloon-tired trucks. Although the park permits leashed dogs, Back Bay National Wildlife Refuge prohibits dogs, including dogs left in cars in its parking lot, as well as in the northernmost mile of its Atlantic beach. The refuge also restricts pedestrian and other access to some trails within it (including those leading to the False Cape visitors' center) between November and March.

== See also ==
- List of Virginia state parks
- Wash Woods
- Virginia Beach, Virginia
- Back Bay National Wildlife Refuge
- Former counties, cities, and towns of Virginia

Preceded by Sandbridge, Virginia Beach	Beaches of The Outer Banks	Succeeded by Currituck Beach
