= Training Support Center Hampton Roads =

US Navy combat training center

Coordinates: 36°47′00″N 75°57′30″W

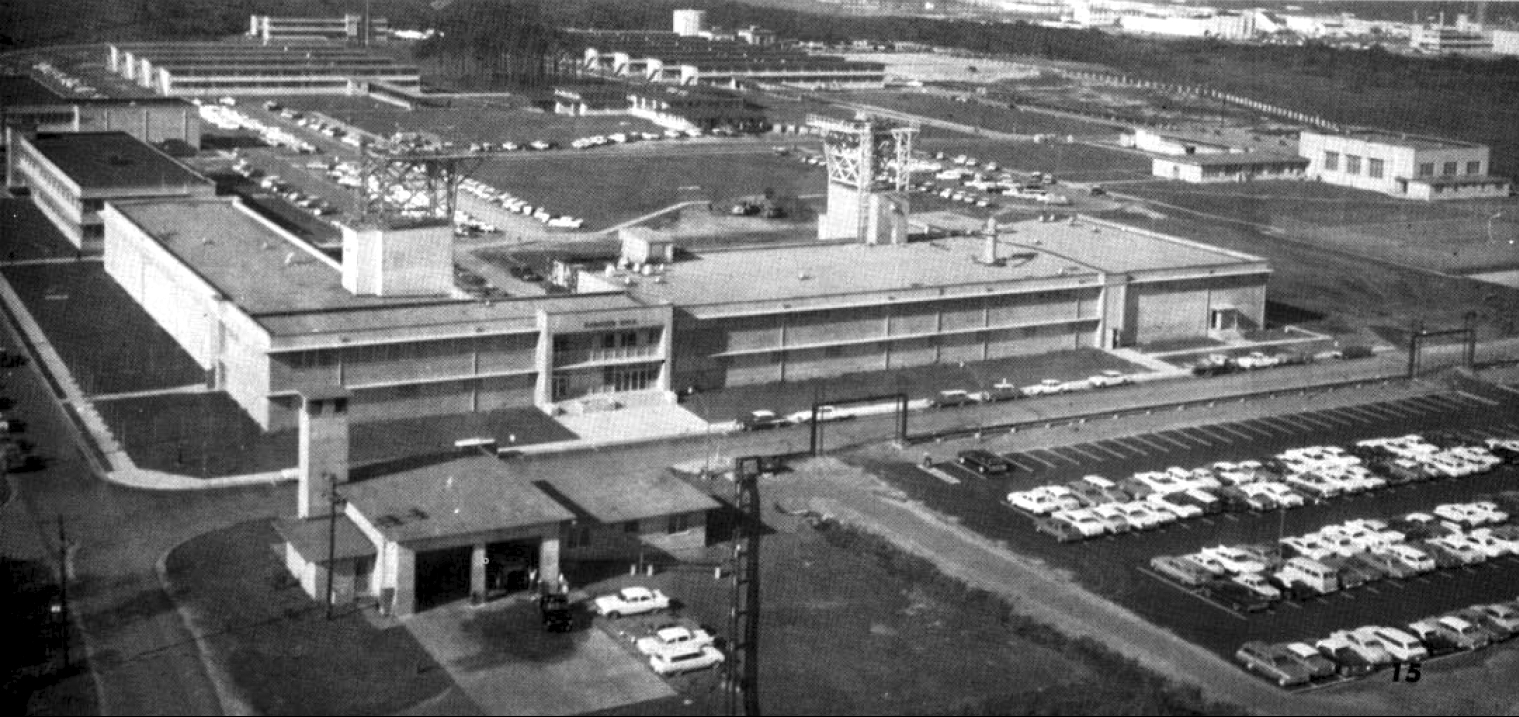
FTC Dam Neck in 1964.

Training Support Center Hampton Roads is, since 2004, the name of the facility in Virginia Beach, Virginia, United States, which was long-known as "FTC Dam Neck". It is the home of the Fleet Combat Training Center Atlantic of the United States Navy.

== History ==
=== Dam Neck Mills, U.S. Lifesaving Service ===
TSC Hampton Roads is located near the former town of Dam Neck Mills which was located in Princess Anne County (the former county is now part of the independent city of Virginia Beach). It was the site of the 19th century Dam Neck Mills Lifesaving Station of the United States Lifesaving Service, one of five spaced at intervals along the coast in Virginia from Cape Henry south to the border of North Carolina. The U.S. Lifesaving Service merged with other agencies to form the United States Coast Guard in 1915.

The area's lifesaving history along the coast line of the Graveyard of the Atlantic is commemorated at the Old Coast Guard Station Museum located in the 1903 Seatack Lifesaving Service Station (the next one north of the Dam Neck Mills station) at 24th street adjacent to the boardwalk of Virginia Beach. The Old Coast Guard Station Museum has artifacts from the 1891 shipwreck of the Dictator, displays of period lifesaving equipment, educational programs, and even an online "Tower Cam", offering Internet users a similar view to those of members of the Lifesaving crews had over 100 years ago.

=== World War II, FTC Dam Neck ===
The United States Navy acquired the property during World War II to train anti-aircraft gunners. Since that, the mission was expanded to include training of Combat Systems operators and maintenance technicians. One notable former tenant command was Naval Guided Missile School (NAVGMSCOL), which provided training for the Polaris, Poseidon, and Trident 1 Backfit submarine-launched ballistic missile (SLBM) systems and various surface missile systems.

== Current mission ==
In 2004, FTC Dam Neck was reorganized and renamed Training Support Center Hampton Roads, to align it with the U.S. Navy's "Revolution In Training". The actual training activity is the Center for Surface Combat Systems, which is headquartered in Dahlgren, Virginia. TSC Hampton Roads supports the training mission, as its name suggests.

== Tenant commands ==
Other tenant commands currently at Dam Neck include the United States Naval Special Warfare Development Group (DEVGRU/NSWDG), Tactical Training Group Atlantic (TACTRAGRULANT), and Naval Surface Warfare Center Dahlgren Division Dam Neck Activity (NSWCDD DNA). TSC Hampton Roads is also home to the Navy and Marine Corps Intelligence Training Center (NMITC), which trains Marines and sailors in military intelligence.

Nearby, Dam Neck Annex is part of Naval Air Station Oceana.
