= Robert J. O'Neill =

US Navy SEAL (born 1976)

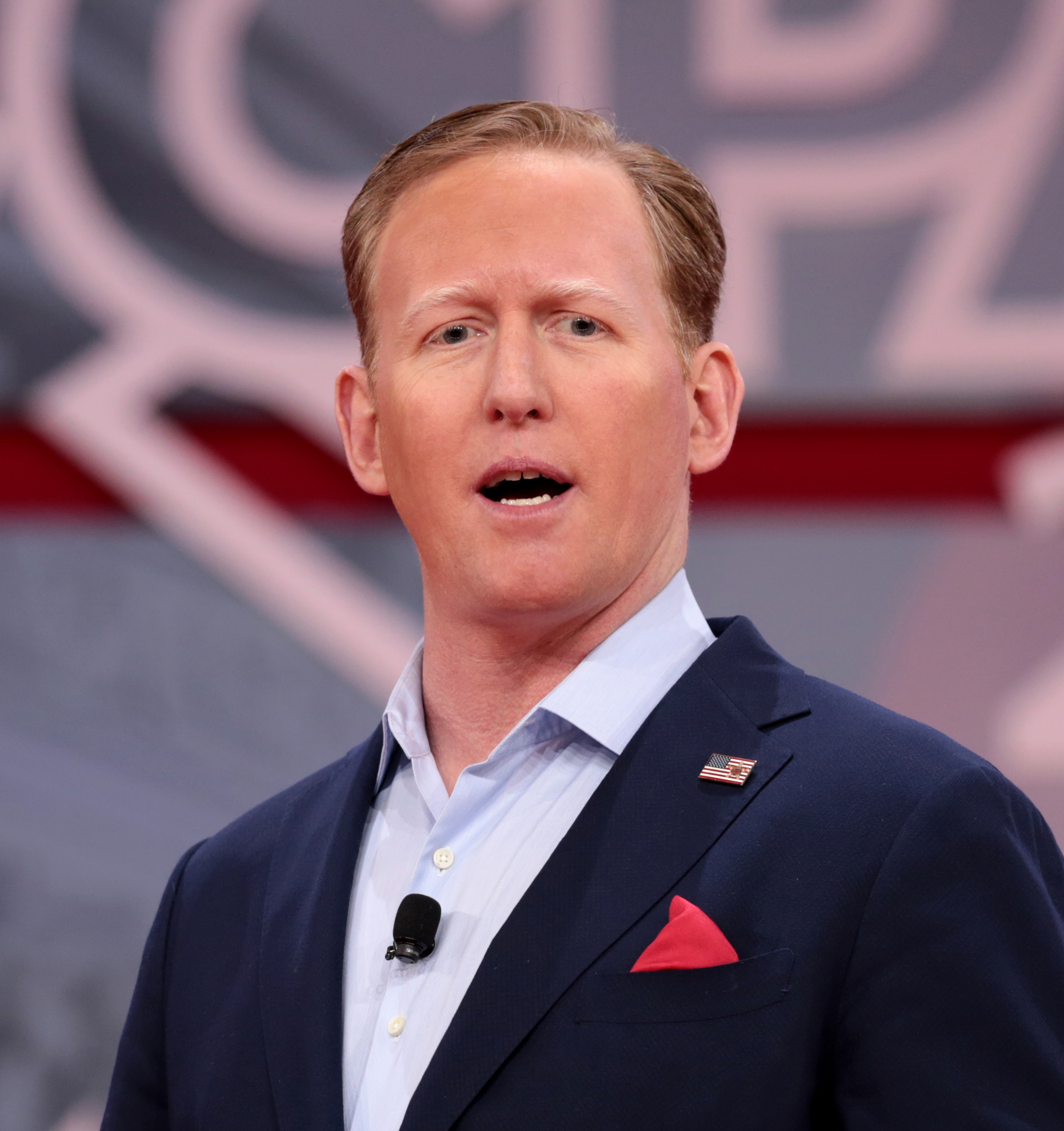
- O'Neill in 2018
- Born: 10 April 1976 (age 50); Butte, Montana, US
- Other name: Rob O'Neill
- Occupations: US Navy SEAL; speaker; TV news pundit; author
- Known for: Claiming to have killed Osama bin Laden
- Military career
- Branch: United States Navy
- Years: 1996–2012 (16.6 years)
- Rank: Senior chief petty officer
- Units: SEAL Team 2 (1996–2001); SEAL Team 4 (2001–2004); SEAL Team 6 (2004–2012)
- Conflicts: Operation Red Wings; Maersk Alabama hijacking; Operation Neptune Spear
- Awards: Silver Star × 2

Robert J. O'Neill (born 22 April 1976) is an author, TV news contributor, and former United States Navy SEAL (1996–2012). After participating in May 2011's Operation Neptune Spear with SEAL Team Six, O'Neill was the subject of controversy for claiming to be the sole individual to kill Osama bin Laden.

== Personal life ==
Born in Butte, Montana, on 10 April 1976, Robert J. O'Neill is the son of Tom O'Neill, Jim Johnson, and Diane Johnson. He graduated from Butte Central High School in 1994, and has attended Montana Technological University. O'Neill married in March 2004, and has at least two children; he and his spouse were legally separated by February 2013. He married again in August 2017 in Cape Cod.

== United States Navy ==
O'Neill told Esquire that he found himself in a United States Navy recruiting office after a relationship breakup. After expressing interest in becoming a sniper, O'Neill enlisted on 29 January 1996. O'Neill reported to Basic Underwater Demolition/SEAL training (BUD/S) at Naval Amphibious Base Coronado and graduated from BUD/S class 208 and joined the Navy SEALs the following year.

In 2013, O'Neill told The Montana Standard that he helped rescue SEAL Marcus Luttrell in Afghanistan, and that he was SEAL Team Six's "lead paratrooper" in the rescue of Richard Phillips from the Maersk Alabama hijacking; these missions were the bases of the 2013 films Lone Survivor and Captain Phillips, respectively. However, the former commander of SEAL Team Six said in 2014 that O'Neill had not played a "singular role" on either mission, adding that "O’Neill's specific role on any of these missions is irrelevant because everything we do is as a team."

During his enlistment, O'Neill received two Silver Stars, four Bronze Star Medals, a Joint Service Commendation Medal (with "V" device), three Presidential Unit Citations, and two Navy and Marine Corps Commendation Medals (with "V" device). He served with SEAL Teams Two (1996–2001), Four (2001–2004), and Six (2004–2012), and attained the rank of senior chief petty officer. Upon his discharge from the Navy on 24 August 2012 (after 16.6 years), O'Neill was still assigned to SEAL Team Six at Virginia Beach, Virginia and had six months and 15 days of sea service to his credit. O'Neill claimed in 2014 that he left the military because he no longer felt "adrenaline when people are shooting, and I knew that that could lead to complacency because if I am not afraid of, that I might wind up doing something stupid thinking that I can't get hurt".

=== Osama bin Laden claim ===
In an anonymous February 2013 interview, O'Neill told Esquire that he had killed Osama bin Laden during Operation Neptune Spear in May 2011. In late 2014, in the run-up to credited Fox News and The Washington Post stories on the same topic, O'Neill's name was leaked by other former special forces personnel who were protesting his violation of "a code of silence that forbids them from publicly taking credit for their actions." O'Neill claimed that he and another unnamed member of SEAL Team Six cornered bin Laden, and that after the other SEAL fired and missed, O'Neill killed the terrorist leader with shots to the head.

Fellow SEAL Matt Bissonnette claimed in No Easy Day that the unnamed point man actually fired the killing shots. According to The Intercept's interview of a former SEAL Team 6 member, when O'Neill arrived at the terrorist leader, bin Laden was already "bleeding out on the floor, possibly already dead, after being shot in the chest and leg by the lead assaulter on the raid." According to another SEAL, O'Neill merely walked over to the immobile al-Qaeda leader and shot him twice in the head. The Intercept said that both O'Neill's and Bissonnette's accountings of the mission "contain multiple self-serving falsehoods."

By August 2020, the federal government of the United States had neither confirmed nor denied O'Neill's claims, though Rear Admiral Brian L. Losey and Force Master Chief Michael Magaraci did encourage all SEALs to abide by their code of silence, saying, "At Naval Special Warfare's core is the SEAL ethos […] A critical tenant [sic] of our ethos is 'I do not advertise the nature of my work, nor seek recognition for my actions.' Our ethos is a life-long commitment and obligation, both in and out of the service. Violators of our ethos are neither teammates in good standing, nor teammates who represent Naval Special Warfare."

Of his decision to lay claim to killing bin Laden, O'Neill told CBS News that "I think it's a difficult secret to keep, […] Everyone was proud. I think it was apparent that we had done it." In 2015, O'Neill and his family were allegedly threatened by the Islamic State of Iraq and the Levant.

On 14 October 2020, US president Donald Trump re-tweeted an unfounded conspiracy theory that suggested Osama bin Laden was still alive and a body double was shot instead. O'Neill, who was a supporter of Trump, responded with a series of tweets, including "It was not a body double. Thank you Mr. President." That same month, CNN published an interview with retired Admiral William H. McRaven, who oversaw Neptune Spear, where he specifically referred to Rob O'Neill as "the SEAL that, in fact, shot bin Laden". As of September 2024, the federal government still had not confirmed O'Neill's account.

=== Post-separation ===
On 20 August 2020, amid the COVID-19 pandemic, O'Neill tweeted a selfie of himself seated aboard a Delta Air Lines plane without a face mask; it was captioned "I'm not a pussy" and was followed by another that said, "Thank God it wasn't @Delta flying us in when we killed bin Laden ... we weren't wearing masks". He later tweeted that he was banned by Delta.

Saying "I can't believe I fought for this bullshit", O'Neill again took to Twitter in May 2023 to criticize the Navy's alleged unreadiness to combat China because active-duty sailor and drag performer Joshua Kelley had been a "digital ambassador" for the service in 2022.

== Civilian life ==
After separating from the US Navy, O'Neill began working as a motivational speaker. In 2015, he became a contributor to the cable news channel Fox News, though had left the company by August 2021, instead appearing on competitor Newsmax TV that October. O'Neill has also published two books:

- The Operator. Simon & Schuster. 2017. ISBN 9781501145032.
- With Meyer, Dakota (1 March 2022). The Way Forward. HarperCollins.

A fan of the Washington Redskins, O'Neill was able to meet the team a week after his claim of shooting bin Laden was publicized in 2014.

In December 2023, O'Neill held a small share of the Armed Forces Brewing Company in Norfolk, Virginia, and served as its brand ambassador and on its board of directors. His previous comments about Joshua Kelley, and his legal trouble in Frisco, prompted public opposition to a proposed brewery a few miles from Naval Station Norfolk; the planning commission voted four-to-two against recommending the brewery permit. After the company removed O'Neill as the company's director of military services and "toned down [his] public-facing role", the brewery opened in February 2024 and closed 13 months later.

On November 4, 2024, O'Neill was criticized online for his sexually charged reply to a tweet by Harry Sisson publicizing five young men's vote for Kamala Harris in the 2024 United States presidential election. To the original tweet stating that "real men support Harris", O'Neill replied: "You're not men. You're boys. If there was no social media, you would be my concubines." He followed up, saying, "These liberal, pussy 'males' will never defend you. I got you .. they don't."

O'Neill has repeatedly promoted a conspiracy theory alleging that Charlie Kirk was killed by a shaped charge instead of a bullet, including during an interview with pro-Hitler commentator Stew Peters.

=== Criminal charges ===
In 2016, O'Neill was charged in Montana with driving under the influence; prosecutors dropped the charges.

On 23 August 2023, O'Neill was arrested in Frisco, Texas, on "a Class A misdemeanor charge of assault causing bodily injury and a Class C misdemeanor charge of public intoxication" after allegedly assaulting a hotel security guard. He was booked into the Collin County jail, and released on a bond of $3,500. In August 2024, O'Neill sued the security guard—Johnny Loomis—for defamation, saying the 2023 claims were fabricated; he also filed suit against Omni Hotels & Resorts for negligence, saying they hired a guard who "lacked adequate qualifications."

== See also ==
- Letter to the American People – Letter published by al-Qaeda in 2002
- List of United States Navy SEALs
