= Seatack, Virginia =

Neighborhood in Virginia Beach, Virginia, US

Seatack
- Unincorporated community
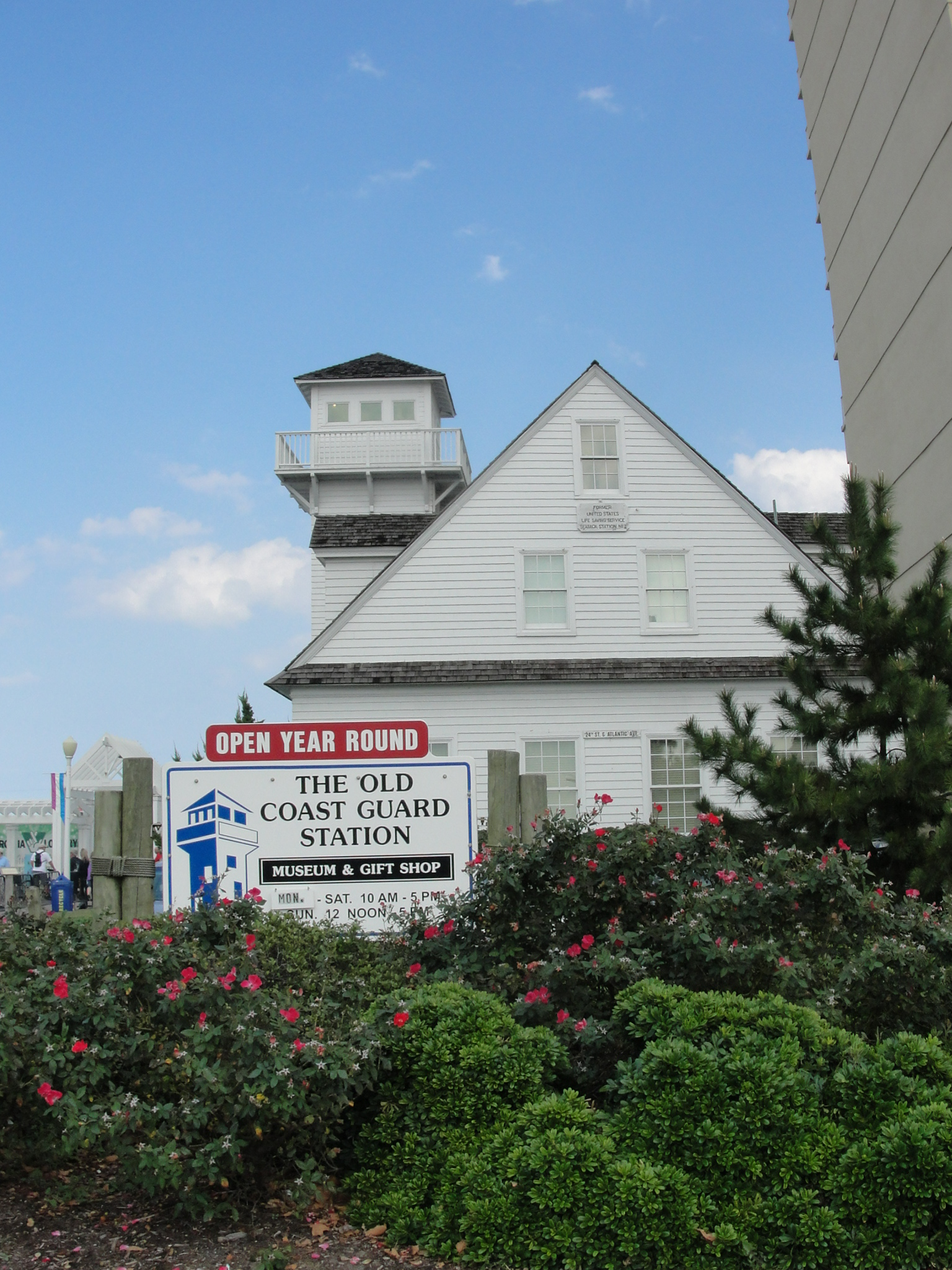
- The Virginia Beach Surf & Rescue Museum, located in Seatack.

- Location within the state of Virginia Seatack (the United States)
- Coordinates: 36°50′33″N 75°59′24″W
- Country: United States
- State: Virginia
- Independent city: Virginia Beach
- Established: 1810

Population Atlas
  - Total: 15,735
- Time zone: UTC-5 (Eastern Standard Time)
  - Summer (DST): UTC-4 (Eastern Daylight Time)
- ZIP code: 23451, 23454
- Area code: 757

Seatack, Virginia is a historic neighborhood and community borough of Virginia Beach, Virginia, that was located in what used to be Princess Anne County, and is now part of the Oceanfront resort strip and adjacent area of the independent city of Virginia Beach. The Seatack community of Virginia Beach includes an area inland from the resort strip along present-day Virginia Beach Boulevard. Seatack Elementary School is located nearby on Birdneck Road. The 1903 Seatack Station of the United States Lifesaving Service (which was the historic precursor to the Coast Guard) is now the Virginia Beach Surf & Rescue Museum at 24th street adjacent to the oceanfront boardwalk.

It is also the oldest African-American neighborhood in the southern part of Virginia Beach (one of 14 historic formerly segregated African-American neighborhoods in Virginia Beach). Although it is currently a very diverse neighborhood and community that is home to many residents of several races and ethnicities, in the past, it was a practically all-African-American neighborhood until the 1970s. This changed due in part to the passage of the Civil Rights Act of 1968 (specifically the Fair Housing Anti-Discrimination Act of the CRA1968) and the developing of infrastructure that spread into the Seatack area of Virginia Beach through the 1960s and 1970s, as part of the city's tourism innovation and infrastructure projects for the resort strip of the Virginia Beach Oceanfront.

== History ==
Seatack was named so because it was the point on the coast of rural Princess Anne County where the community was the target of cannonballs fired from British ships and was where troops came ashore during an attack in the War of 1812. The isolated stretch of beach place became known as "Sea Attack", and was gradually shortened to "Sea 'ttack", and then, finally to the portmanteau of, simply "Seatack". Seatack was the location of the first "resort" hotel in Virginia in 1884, which opened after a 19-mile-long narrow gauge railroad was built from Norfolk in 1883. It was remodeled in 1888 and renamed the "Princess Anne Hotel", a massive 2 block wooden facility, which attracted vacationers from considerable distances from all across the United States. In 1891, while hotel guests watched, surfmen from the Seatack station of the United States Lifesaving Service were involved in the rescue efforts for the shipwreck of the Norwegian barque, the Dictator, which ran aground near present-day 37th street. Seven people died, including the Captain's wife and small child, leading to the Norwegian Lady memorials and several local legends. The hotel burned down in 1907.

In the early 1900s, the name Seatack became more specifically applied to an area west of the beach where a segregated African-American neighborhood was established in Princess Anne County. According to official Virginia Beach history, before the passage of the Civil Rights Act of 1968, Black Americans were only allowed to settle in this area because White Americans did not see any infrastructure value for the swampy, wooded areas of land that made up much of the Seatack area near the Virginia Beach Oceanfront. Black Americans settled this area, thrived there, developed it into a highly populated and economically strong neighborhood. Black people who lived in the area called Seatack made many historical accomplishments in the segregated county of Princess Anne, that included raising money to build schools for their children (namely, the Princess Anne County Training School—1938, among other schools), starting one of the first Black-owned fire stations in Eastern Virginia (the Seatack Fire Station), because the black neighborhood was not serviced by the Princess Anne County fire and rescue department at the time, building churches (Mount Olive Baptist, St. Stephens Church of God in Christ (COGIC)) to worship in, and later on, after the passage of the Civil Rights Acts of 1964 and 1968, a parks and recreation center, and a community daycare center. In 1985, Mr. Joseph V. Grimstead Sr., an African American businessman and civic leader from Seatack, and President of Seatack Community Properties, Inc., dedicated the land for the Seatack Community and Recreation Center to be built. The current facility opened on April 19, 1997. On October 15, 2011, the Seatack Civic League held its 200th Annual Birthday Celebration. It was the first major African American community event ever held in the City of Virginia Beach, and the first large event held at the Virginia Beach Convention Center by African Americans. Bishop Barnett K. Thoroughgood, who was a Pentecostal Church of God in Christ pastor and church leader from Seatack's funeral services were also held there on February 10, 2012, and set a new record of attendance for an African American event having over 4,000. On January 7, 2012, the City of Virginia Beach named the first city building after an African American man, Joseph V. Grimstead Sr Seatack Community Recreation Center, on the site of the old Seatack Fire Station. Most recently on June 25, 2012, Mayor William D. Sessoms along with senior residents of Seatack and Seatack Civic League officials held the Grand Opening of the Seatack Civic - College Funding Office at 141 South Birdneck Road at the Joseph V. Grimstead Sr. Seatack Community Recreation Center.

In 1915, the United States Lifesaving Service became the United States Coast Guard. The station at Seatack (built in 1903 to replace an earlier structure) is now a museum at 24th street adjacent to the boardwalk of Virginia Beach. The area's lifesaving history along the coast line of the Graveyard of the Atlantic is commemorated at the Virginia Beach Surf & Rescue Museum which has artefacts from the shipwreck of the Dictator barque, displays of period lifesaving equipment, and educational programs. The museum also has a webcam which shows Internet users a view similar to that of members of the lifesaving crews had over 100 years ago.

The Virginia Beach Surf & Rescue Museum was added to the National Register of Historic Places in 1979.

Another extant Coast Guard Station was located at Little Island, located south of Sandbridge, Virginia. The City of Virginia Beach owns it. However, the Little Island Coast Guard Station is not open to the public.

In 2019, Seatack received its official Historic Landmark placard, recognizing that Seatack has been a model for growth within the African American community. This historic recognition led to the honor of being showcased in the construction of the African American Cultural Center of Virginia Beach, where all 14 historic African-American neighborhoods in Virginia Beach, Virginia will be recognized and experienced.

== Notable people ==
Notable Virginia Beach residents who lived in the Seatack community during a significant portion of their life or who lived in Seatack during their formative years include rappers Pharrell Williams, Timbaland, NFL Football player Eli Harold, astronaut Alan B. Shepard, and actress Chyler Leigh.
