= Wash Woods, Virginia =

Human settlement in Virginia, United States of America

Coordinates: 36°34′47″N 75°52′23″W

Wash Woods was an unincorporated town on the coast of the Atlantic Ocean in the former Princess Anne County (now the independent City of Virginia Beach), in the southeastern corner of Virginia. It has been abandoned since the 1930s, except for the Life Saving Station which remained operational until the mid-1950s. The site of the former town is located within False Cape State Park in Virginia Beach.

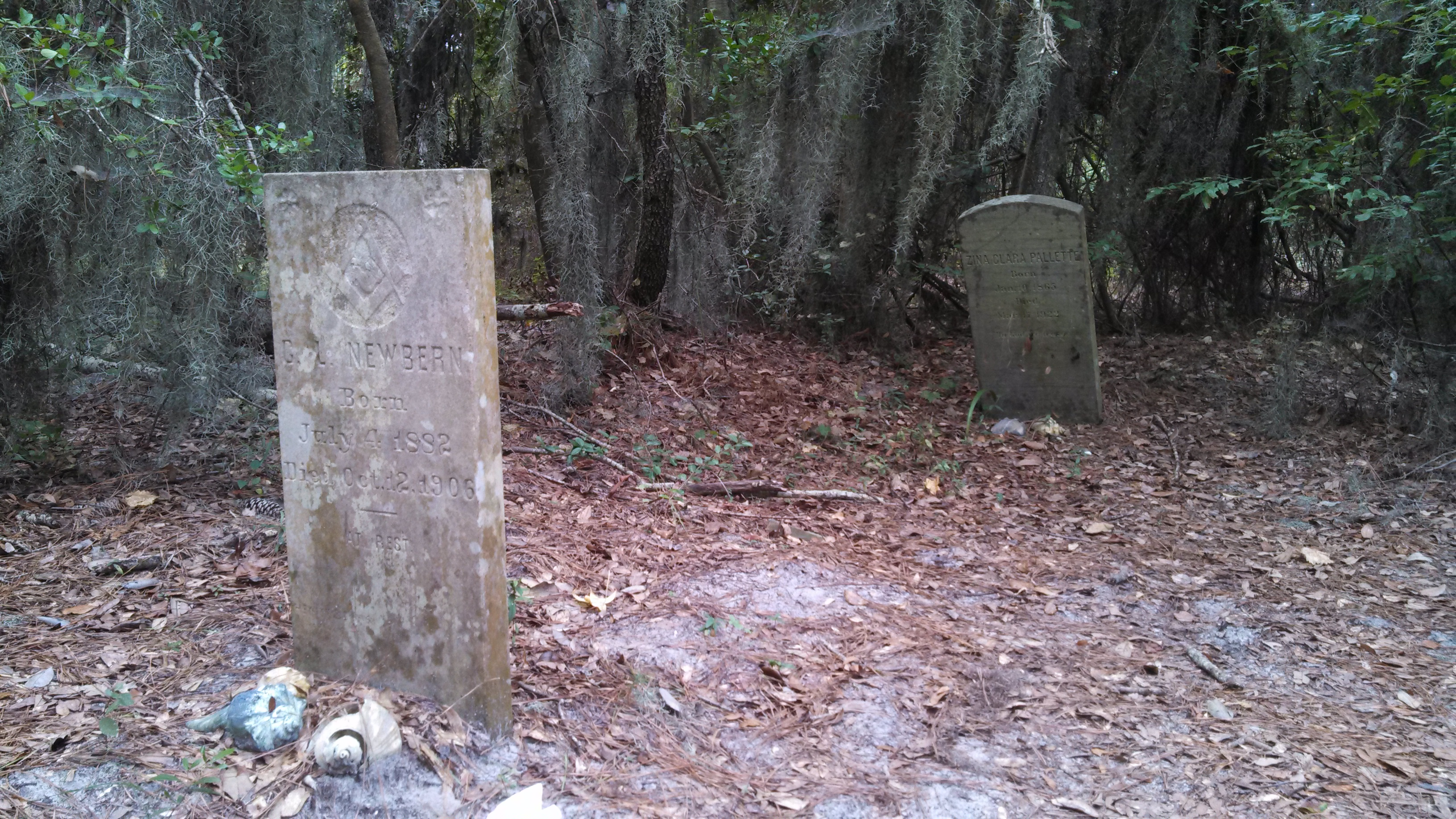
Wash Woods cemetery in False Cape State Park

== History ==
According to legend, the community was settled by survivors of a shipwreck who waded ashore centuries ago on the remote and uninhabited stretch of beach and decided to stay. The village's Methodist church and several other structures were built using cypress wood that washed ashore from schooner John S. Wood that ran aground with a load of lumber and broke apart during a storm in 1889. By the turn of the 20th century Wash Woods was home to two lifesaving stations, a grocery store, two churches, and a school. Three hundred people once lived there, working as fishermen, farmers, hunting guides, market hunters, and as lifesavers patrolling the beach and manning lifeboats to rescue shipwrecked sailors.

Located along the section of the US East Coast long known as the Graveyard of the Atlantic, from its beginnings the small town of Wash Woods was subject to the severe weather conditions which had shipwrecked its first residents and brought the lumber ashore to build it. Residents staffed one of the first life saving stations, called False Cape, established in 1875. After the disastrous wrecks of the USS Huron at Nags Head and steamship Metropolis a few miles south of Wash Woods near the Currituck Beach Lighthouse, both of which resulted in great loss of life, Congress responded to the public outcry and an additional lifesaving station known as Deal's Island Station was established south of Wash Woods in 1877. The station was renamed Wash Woods for the nearby town circa 1883, and in 1917 the original lifesaving station was replaced by a new more modern US Coast Guard station.

The sea inundated the narrow sliver of sand so often that townspeople had begun to leave Wash Woods by the 1920s. Another factor was the Migratory Bird Treaty Act signed in 1918 which outlawed market hunting of waterfowl. When the disastrous 1933 Chesapeake–Potomac hurricane followed by the equally severe 1933 Outer Banks hurricane struck back to back, it essentially sealed the town's fate. The storm surge caused by the category 4 storms flooded the entire area, damaged many buildings including the Coast Guard Station, and washed most of the fertile topsoil from farm fields into Back Bay. Subsequently, the few remaining residents of Wash Woods relocated across Back Bay to Knotts Island or to mainland Princess Anne County and the site became the location of several waterfowl hunting clubs until 1968 when the land was taken over by the Commonwealth of Virginia to become a state park.

Today, the area is a Virginia state park known as False Cape State Park, that adjoins the federally managed Back Bay National Wildlife Refuge. There is still a small cemetery adjacent to the ruins of the Wash Woods Methodist church, the steeple of which remained standing through the 1970s. Vandals demolished the steeple circa 1980. False Cape State Park's Wash Woods Environmental Education Center is housed a converted hunt club house.

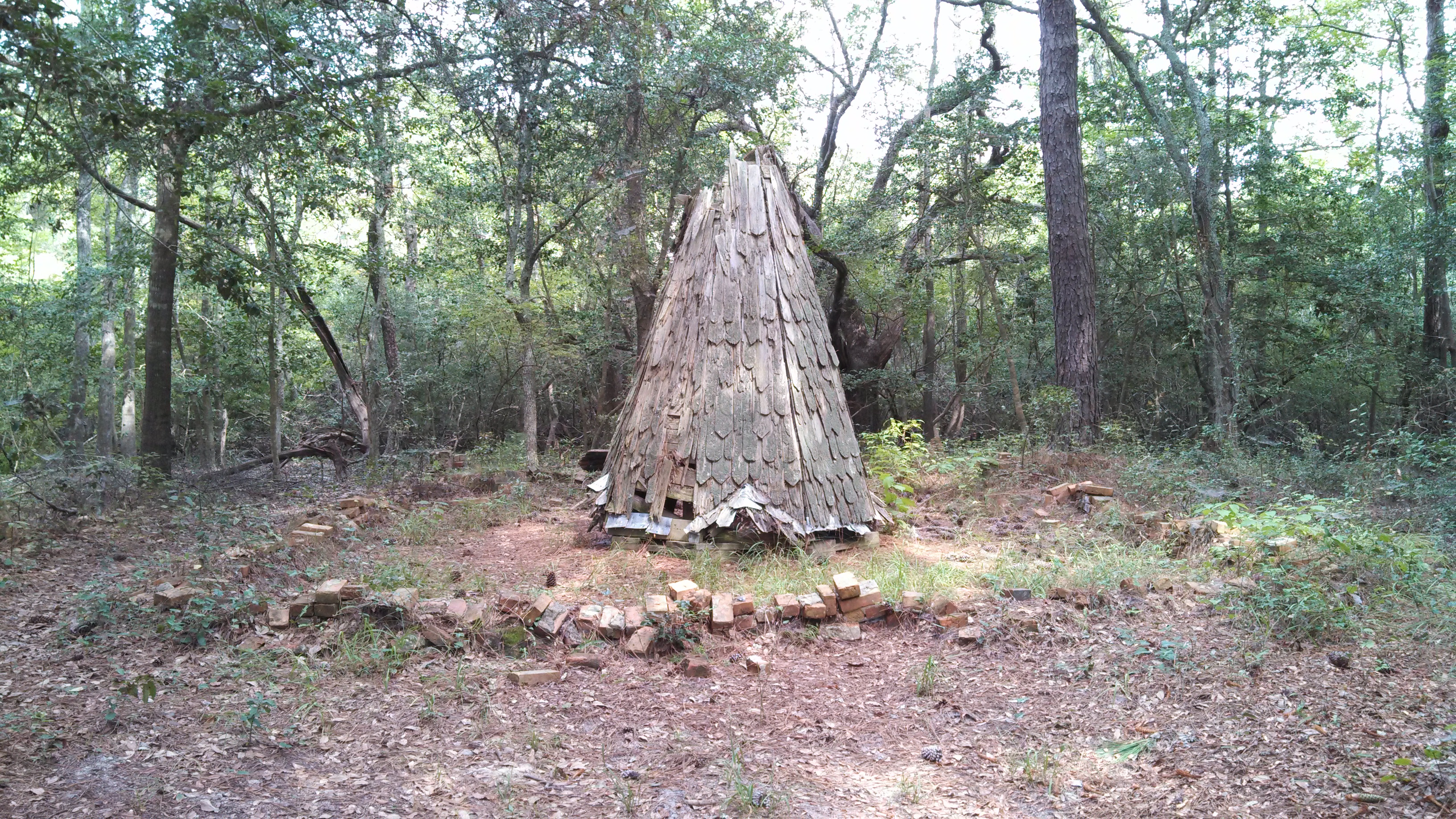
Wash Woods Methodist Church steeple in False Cape State Park

The Wash Woods Coast Guard station, built in 1917, still stands a few miles south of the site of the former town across the state line in Carova Beach. The former Coast Guard Station was completely restored in 1989 and is now used as a real estate office.

In the mid-1950s, Wash Woods remained a voting precinct consisting of 13 registered voters. On most election days, all of the 13 voters would meet just after midnight and vote. Under Virginia law at that time, when all the voters of any given precinct had voted in person, the precinct could close and report the results of the voting. Since the state at that time was basically a Democratic state controlled by a political machine headed by U.S. Senator Harry F. Byrd, Sr., and known as the Byrd Organization all of the registered voters of the precinct always voted for the Democratic ticket. The results of the voting at the Wash Woods precinct was reported soon after midnight as a psychological device to promote the Democratic Party, whether in local elections or in national elections. In the mid-1960s, during a local election, a group of local Democrats who opposed the local branch of the Byrd organization arranged for two voters to register to vote at the Wash Woods precinct. Those two voters then submitted their votes by mail. Under Virginia law, persons who had voted by mail had a right to report to their precinct on election day, pick up their previously mailed ballots, and then vote in person. Because these two voters had submitted their ballots by mail, the precinct could not close immediately after midnight on that election day and the psychological advantage previously offered by the precinct was lost. Immediately after that election, elected local officials representing the local branch of the Byrd organization dissolved the Wash Woods precinct and transferred the registered voters of that precinct to a larger adjoining precinct.

== See also ==
- False Cape State Park
- Back Bay National Wildlife Refuge
- Former counties, cities, and towns of Virginia
