= Samuel L. Green Jr. =

American bishop of the Church of God in Christ

Bishop Samuel Lee Green Jr.
- Bishop
- Church: Church of God in Christ
- See: Historic Second Ecclesiastical Jurisdiction of Virginia
- Predecessor: Bishop D. Lawrence Williams
- Successor: Bishop Wilbert L. Daniels

Personal details
- Born: Samuel Lee Green Jr. March 27, 1927
- Died: June 26, 2016 (aged 89)
- Spouse: Vivian F. Green (1948–2007; her death) Lue Jinnie F. Green (2008-2016; his death)

Samuel Lee Green Jr. (March 27, 1927 – June 26, 2016) was an American pastor and bishop in the Church of God in Christ.

== Biography ==
Samuel Lee Green Jr. was born to Deacon Samuel Lee and Mrs. Leosia P. Green on March 27, 1927. Green was a graduate of the Booker T. Washington High School and attended Old Dominion University. He received an Honorary Degree of Divinity at Trinity Hall College in Springfield, IL.

Bishop Green married Mother Vivian F. Green in 1948 and to that union nine children were born: Jurisdictional Supervisor Mother Jacqueline G. Holmes, Apostle Norvice G. Sellers, Bishop Dwight L. Green Sr., Pastor Samuel L. Green III, Missionary Nathalie G. Neal, Missionary Naomi G. Ward, Missionary Deborah G. Golden, Pastor Phillip X. Green and Pastor Michael D. Green. He was married to Vivian F. Green until she died in 2007, and remarried in 2008 to LueJinne F. Green.

Green was pastor at St. John's Church of God in Christ in Newport News, VA for 45 years. He was appointed to the office of Bishop by Bishop J. O. Patterson Sr. in 1973 and became the prelate of the Second Jurisdiction of Virginia. Under his leadership, the jurisdiction went from having 52 churches to 72 churches. In 1984, Bishop Green was appointed to the General Board of the Church of God in Christ. He officially retired from the General Board on November 12, 2012 and was declared an emeritus member of the General Board by Bishop Charles Blake.

Bishop Green died on June 26, 2016.
