= Sehesteds plass =

Square in Oslo, Norway

Coordinates: 59.91571°N 10.73918°E

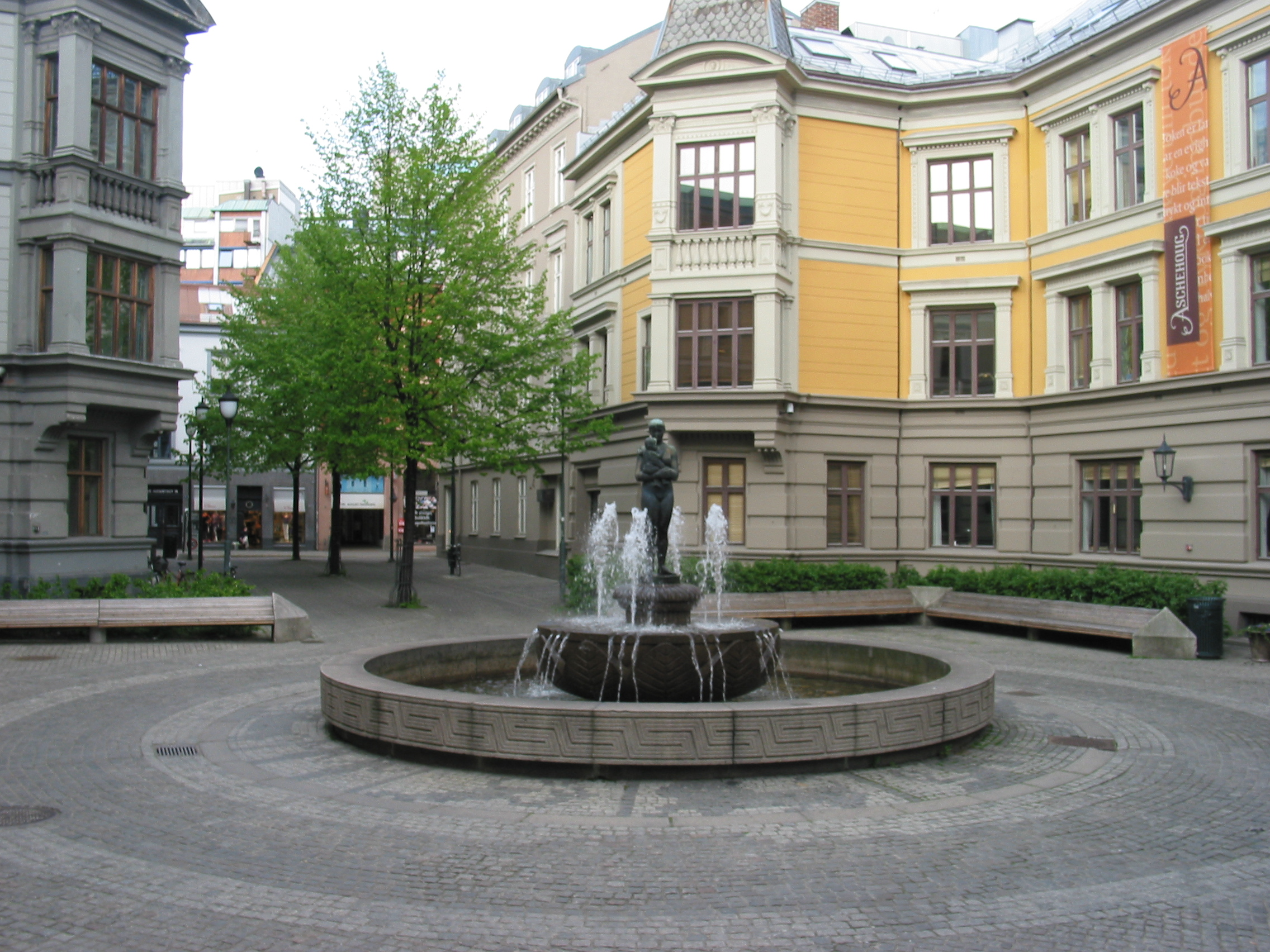
Sehesteds plass seen from the south.

Sehesteds plass ('Sehested's Square') is a square in Oslo, Norway.

The square is modelled after Place Vendôme in Paris, and is named after the Governor of Norway Hannibal Sehested.

The publishing houses H. Aschehoug & Co and Gyldendal Norsk Forlag have their respective headquarters here. The square is a plot element in Henrik H. Langeland's novel Wonderboy.
