= Port Orford Heads State Park =

State park in Oregon, United States

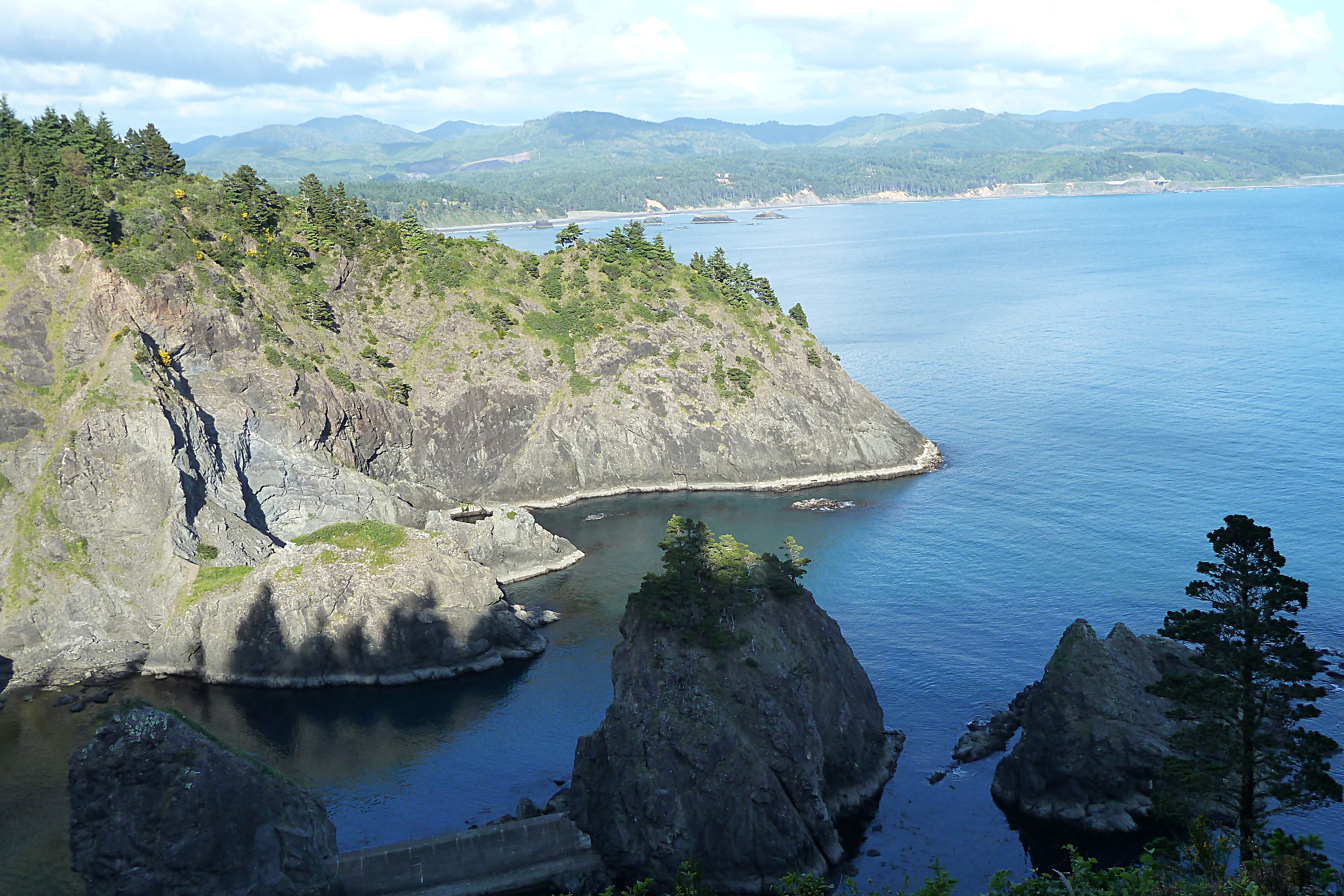
- Port Orford Heads State Park, May 2014

- Location within Oregon Location within the United States
- Type: Public, state
- Location: Port Orford, Curry County, Oregon
- Coordinates: 42°44′24″N 124°30′49″W
- Created: 1976
- Operator: Oregon Parks and Recreation Department
- Port Orford Coast Guard Station
- U.S. National Register of Historic Places
- Built: 1934
- Built by: United States Coast Guard
- NRHP reference No.: 98000606
- Added to NRHP: May 29, 1998

Port Orford Heads State Park is a coastal state park in northwest Curry County, Oregon, United States, in the city of Port Orford. Established in 1976, it is administered by the Oregon Parks and Recreation Department.

== Location ==
Located on a bluff above the city, the park has three main walking trails: the Cove, Tower and Headland trails. From each of these vantage points (at the right time of year) one can see commercial fishing boats, orcas, gray whales, California and Steller's sea lions, and various seabirds. The Headland Trail offers an unrestricted view of Cape Blanco to the north and is a popular whale watching spot during the fall. The park is open for day use only.

== History ==
From 1934 to 1970, one of the earliest US Coast Guard lifeboat stations on the Oregon Coast operated at what later became the park.

== Lifeboat Station Museum ==
The Port Orford Lifeboat Station is a museum and interpretive center that was opened in 2000 by the Point Orford Heritage Society. Built in 1934, the building is on the National Register of Historic Places (as the Port Orford Coast Guard Station) and was used by the U.S. Coast Guard until 1970. The museum includes the station's refurbished, unsinkable 36-foot (11 m) motor life boat, and information about the Japanese bombing of the south Oregon coast during World War II.

Unsinkable 36-foot (11 m) motor life boat

== See also ==
- List of Oregon State Parks
