= Graveyard of the Atlantic =

Nickname for ocean area near North Carolina

Graveyard of the Atlantic is a nickname for the treacherous waters and area of numerous shipwrecks off the Outer Banks of North Carolina, United States, which are due to the coast's shifting sands and inlets. To a lesser degree, this nickname has also been applied to Sable Island off of Nova Scotia, Canada, as well as the waters off Cape Cod, Massachusetts, United States.

== Outer Banks ==
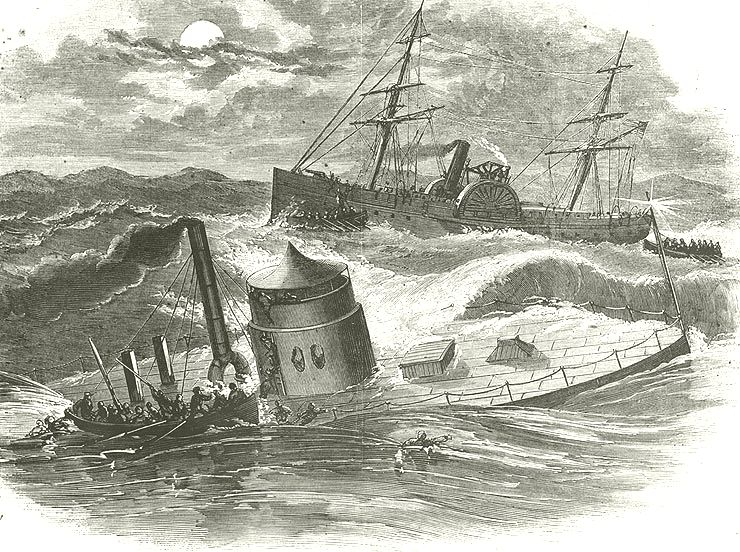
Line engraving published in "Harper's Weekly", 1863, depicting the USS Monitor sinking in a storm off Cape Hatteras on the night of 30–31 December 1862.

Along the Outer Banks, navigational challenges posed by the Diamond Shoals area off Cape Hatteras, caused the loss of thousands of ships and an unknown number of human lives. More than 5,000 ships have sunk in these waters since recordkeeping began in 1526. The Graveyard of the Atlantic Museum, located in Hatteras Village, focuses on the history of this area and features many artifacts recovered from area shipwrecks.

Among the better known shipwrecks were the USS Monitor, a participant in the famous Battle of Hampton Roads during the American Civil War, and the Patriot which carried Theodosia Burr Alston, Aaron Burr's daughter. The Monitor foundered and sank on December 31, 1862, off Cape Hatteras, while the Patriot presumably sank off the coast in January 1813. The first recorded shipwreck off the coast of North Carolina was in 1526 off the mouth of Cape Fear River. The large numbers of explorers who came to the area in subsequent years had to travel through the rough waters to get to the coast of North Carolina. In June 1718, Edward Teach—better known as Blackbeard the pirate—ran his flagship, the Queen Anne's Revenge, aground near present-day Beaufort Inlet, NC. Thirty-two years later, in August 1750, at least three Spanish merchantmen ran aground off North Carolina during a hurricane: the El Salvador sank near Cape Lookout, while the Nuestra Señora de Soledad went ashore on near present-day Core Banks, and the Nuestra Señora de Guadalupe went ashore near present-day Ocracoke Island. Survivors of a much earlier shipwreck created the lost town of Wash Woods, Virginia, using lumber that washed ashore. However, the extreme weather eventually claimed the town as well.

The Graveyard extends along the whole of the North Carolina coast, northward past Chicamacomico, Bodie Island, and Nags Head to Sandbridge Beach, and southward in curving arcs to the points at Cape Lookout and Cape Fear. This spot is known as Cape Point, which is the stretch of beach that divides Hatteras Island's north- and south-facing beaches. It is a very famous spot on the east coast, despite its fragile location.

Cape Hatteras has been a deadly trap for sailors that have entered over the centuries. The stretch of shore is home to more than 600 shipwrecks off the shifting sandbars of the Hatteras Islands. The sandbars shift due to rough waves and unpredictable currents.

Another danger was the Outer Banks "wreckers." Some residents of the Outer Banks, known as wreckers, made part of their living by scavenging wrecked ships—or by luring ships to their destruction. Horses with a lantern tied to their neck would be walked along the beach. The lanterns' up and down motion would appear to other ships to represent clear water and a ship ahead. The unsuspecting captain would then drive his ship ashore following the false light.

During World War II, German U-boats would sit offshore and prey on passing freighters and tankers silhouetted against the lights onshore. Hundreds of ships along the North Carolina coast were torpedoed by submarines in this fashion in what became known as Torpedo Alley.

In the twenty-first century, ships still have trouble in the area, including the Bounty, which sank off Cape Hatteras in 2012 due to Hurricane Sandy, and a 72-foot fishing boat called the Ocean Pursuit, which ran aground on Bodie Island in 2020.

== Sable Island ==
The title "Graveyard of the Atlantic" is also applied to Sable Island, a narrow crescent of sand that lies 300 km southeast of Halifax, Nova Scotia. There have been over 350 recorded shipwrecks since HMS Delight in 1583.

People believe that the island was first discovered in the 1520s by the European explorer João Álvares Fagundes, who named it Fagundes, but the name was changed by the French at the end of the 16th century to île de Sable, which means Sand Island. The island is little more than a 40 km-long sandbar, although it does have a number of freshwater ponds. It is only 1.5 km wide at its widest; the highest point on the island is approximately 30 metres tall.

Rev. Andrew Le Mercier was a French Huguenot priest from Boston who tried to colonize the island in 1738. There are approximately 400–550 feral horses that are believed to be the descendants of survivors of those that were introduced by Le Mercier. These horses feed off the wild grass, plants and fresh water sources throughout the island. Sable Island is home to the largest grey seal colony in the world. There are also many types of birds, including the Ipswich sparrow, who breeds only on Sable Island. In 2013, Sable Island was designated a National Park Reserve.

In the age of sail, the danger of Sable Island was due to the shifting sandbars that surround it, and the thick fog in the area due to the close proximity of the cold Labrador Current and warm Gulf Stream current. Ships were often pushed onto its shores during storms, resulting in a lifesaving station being established there in 1801. In 1872, the Canadian Government added two lighthouses one on each end of island, which helped reduce the number of wrecks. The last shipwreck was a yacht named Merrimac, which occurred in 1999. With the many advances in modern navigation, the two lighthouses have been decommissioned.

Due to the strange (and mostly uninhabited) location of Sable Island, Guglielmo Marconi made it an outpost for radio communication experimentation. In 1901, Marconi thought this Atlantic island would be a good location for a wireless station for transatlantic communication.

== Cape Cod ==
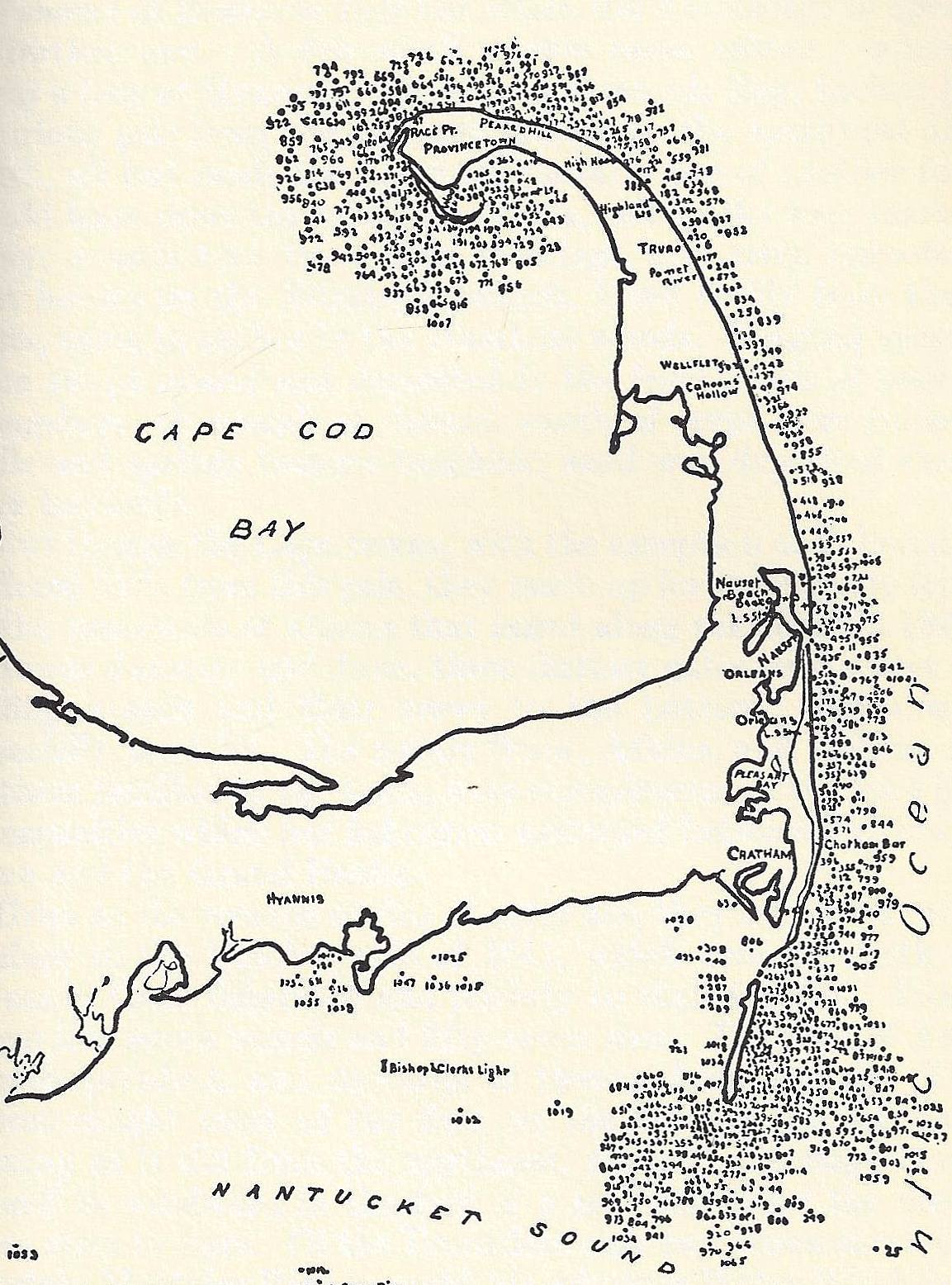
Approximate locations of Cape Cod shipwrecks, as of 1903

The Lower Cape and Outer Cape sections of Cape Cod have also sometimes been called The Graveyard of the Atlantic or similar appellations. About 3,000 shipwrecks have occurred there in recorded history.

Hazards off of Cape Cod include shifting underwater shoals, thick fog and violent storms. The number of wrecks dropped significantly after the opening of the Cape Cod Canal in 1918, as ships could pass through the canal to the sheltered waters of Cape Cod Bay instead of traveling around or past the cape.

Significant wrecks off of Lower and Outer Cape Cod include the Sparrow-Hawk, which was the first recorded wreck off Cape Cod, in 1626, and which was salvaged in 1863; the Whydah Gally of English pirate Black Sam Bellamy, which sank in 1717 with a large treasure and was not located until 1984, becoming the only fully authenticated Golden Age pirate shipwreck ever discovered; and HMS Somerset, a 70-gun third-rate ship of the line of the Royal Navy, which wrecked in a storm in 1778.

== See also ==
- Graveyard of the Great Lakes
- Graveyard of the Pacific
