= Green Run Collegiate =

Location
- 1700 Dahlia Drive; Virginia Beach, Virginia 23453; United States
- 36.804639°N 76.111361°W

Information
- School type: Public Charter school, high school
- Motto: Sapere Aude (Dare to Learn)
- Founded: September 2013
- School district: Virginia Beach City Public Schools
- Superintendent: Aaron C. Spence
- Head of School: Rianne Patricio
- Staff: 25
- Grades: 9-12
- Enrollment: 282 (2018)
- Language: English
- Colors: Royal Blue, Kelly Green, and White
- Athletics conference: Virginia High School League; Beach District; Eastern Region
- Mascot: Stallions
- Website: greenruncollegiate.vbschools.com

Green Run Collegiate High School, established 2013, is a charter school operating in Virginia Beach City Public Schools district located at 1700 Dahlia Drive (Green Run High School campus) of the Green Run area of suburban Virginia Beach, Virginia. It offers the International Baccalaureate. Although they are located in the same building as Green Run High School they are two separate schools. The mission of the school is to prepare students for success in a global society with attending college and joining the workforce or serving the nation with the military.

== History ==
Green Run High Collegiate was opened in September 2013. In 2017, it had its first graduating class.

== Governance ==
As a public charter school, GRC can offer distinctive curriculum, develop its own school calendar and hold classes outside of the traditional school day. In Virginia Beach, a public charter must be approved by the School Board but the responsibility for staffing and oversight of daily operations is guided by the GRC Governing Board.

== School structure ==
As of 2018, the student body is composed of 40% male and 60% female along with a 77% minority population. The total Economically Disadvantaged enrollment is 49%

== Admissions ==
In its first year, the school admitted only ninth-grade students of Virginia Beach City Public Schools up to max 100 students. Subsequent years added more grades until four years were filled at a maximum of 400 students. If applications exceeded for that year, a lottery would be held.

== Curriculum ==
As an International Baccalaureate or IB school they offer three pathways along with The Middle Years Program (MYP). In IB the three pathways are the Diploma Programme (DP) who pursues the IB diploma. The Diploma Course Candidate which takes a selection of IB classes without pursuing the diploma, and the Career-related Programme (CP) which takes IB classes and earns industry certification at either the Advanced Technology Center(ATC) or the Technical and Career Education Center.

== Extracurricular activities ==
Green Run Collegiate has partnered with the Virginia Museum of Contemporary Art. In 2017, they produced the Mindfully Cloaked exhibition on the topic of mental illness, creating several cloaks using mixed media. Later in October 2018, the Chrysler Museum exhibited 100 Green Run Collegiate students artworks made from recyclable material to represent "sustainability and preservation".

Green Run Collegiate teamed up with Green Run High School on their NJROTC program. In 2017 and 2018, the NJROTC team placed first at the Navy Nationals. They placed second in the 2019 Navy Nationals.

== Campus ==
Green Run Collegiate operates on the Green Run High School campus as an independent school.

In June 2018, Green Run Collegiate received a $25,000 Lowe's SkillsUSA grant for the campus community garden, for the purpose of "raising awareness on affordable and sustainable eating."

== Awards and recognition ==
In 2018, U.S. News & World Report gave the Bronze Medal ranking to Green Run Collegiate, with scores of 94 percent in Mathematics Proficiency and 96 percent in Reading Proficiency.

== Heads of School ==
- Barbara Winn (2013– 2018)
- Rianne Patricio (2018–present)

== See also ==
- AAA Eastern Region
- AAA Beach District
