= Green Run (disambiguation) =

The Green Run was a secret U.S. Government release of radioactive fission products.

Green Run may also refer to:

== Places ==
- Green Run, Virginia, a residential and commercial community in Virginia Beach, Virginia
  - Green Run High School, in the above community
- Green Run, Pleasants County, West Virginia, an unincorporated community in Pleasants County
- Green Run (Spring Brook), a stream in Lackawanna County, Pennsylvania

== Other ==
- A 2021 series of tests of the SLS rocket
