= Chris Beatty =

American gridiron football player and coach (born 1973)

Personal information
- Born: June 19, 1973 (age 53); Topeka, Kansas, U.S.

Career information
- Position: Wide receiver
- High school: Chantilly (VA)
- College: East Tennessee State

Career history

Playing
- Baltimore Stallions (1995); Hamilton Tiger-Cats (1997)

Coaching
- North Stafford HS (VA) (1998–2000) Head coach; Salem HS (VA) (2001–2002) Head coach; Landstown HS (VA) (2003–2005) Head coach; Hampton (2006) Offensive coordinator & quarterbacks coach; Northern Illinois (2007) Running backs coach; West Virginia (2008–2010) Running backs coach & slot receivers coach; Vanderbilt (2011) Wide receivers coach & recruiting coordinator; Illinois (2012) Co-offensive coordinator & quarterbacks coach; Wisconsin (2013) Wide receivers coach; Wisconsin (2014) Wide receivers coach & recruiting coordinator; Virginia (2015) Assistant head coach & running backs coach; Maryland (2016) Wide receivers coach; Maryland (2017) Associate head coach & wide receivers coach; Maryland (2018) Associate head coach, co-offensive coordinator & wide receivers coach; Pittsburgh (2019–2020) Wide receivers coach; Los Angeles Chargers (2021–2023) Wide receivers coach; Chicago Bears (2024) Wide receivers coach; Chicago Bears (2024) Interim offensive coordinator; Las Vegas Raiders (2025) Wide receivers coach

Awards and highlights
- As player: All-Southern Conference (1994); As coach: Virginia High School League AAA State Championship (2004); Virginia High School League AAA Coach of the Year (2004)

Head coaching record
- Career: 78–18 (.813) (high school)
- Coaching profile at Pro Football Reference

Christopher Beatty (born June 19, 1973) is an American professional football coach and former wide receiver who most recently served as the wide receivers coach for the Las Vegas Raiders of the National Football League (NFL). He recently served as the interim offensive coordinator for the Chicago Bears. He has previously served as the wide receivers coach for the Los Angeles Chargers from 2021 to 2023.

Beatty played college football at East Tennessee State University as a wide receiver and played in the Canadian Football League for two seasons with the Baltimore Stallions and Hamilton Tiger-Cats. He previously served as an assistant coach for the Los Angeles Chargers, the University of Pittsburgh, University of Maryland, College Park, University of Virginia, University of Wisconsin–Madison, University of Illinois Urbana-Champaign, Vanderbilt University, West Virginia University, Northern Illinois University and Hampton University.

== Early life ==
Christopher Beatty was born in 1973 in Topeka, Kansas, but grew up in Centreville, Virginia. Beatty attended Chantilly High School in Chantilly, Virginia, where he graduated in 1991. Upon his graduation, Beatty attended East Tennessee State.

From 1991 to 1994, he was a starter at wide receiver where he earned All-Southern Conference honors his senior season. He ended his career as the school's all-time leader in receiving yards with 1,813 yards on 125 receptions.

== Playing career ==
Following his graduation of ETSU with a bachelor's degree in 1995, Beatty moved on to play professional football in the Canadian Football League with the Baltimore Stallions. In 1997, Beatty played for the CFL's Hamilton Tiger-Cats before retiring from his playing career.

== Coaching career ==
=== High school ===
Chris Beatty began his coaching career in 1998 with North Stafford High School in Virginia as the school's head coach. Beatty coached the Wolverines football team until 2000, when he moved on to Salem High School in Virginia Beach, Virginia. After compiling a 38-16 record at North Stafford HS and Salem HS (and leading both schools to the state playoffs), Beatty moved on from Salem following the 2002 season.

From 2003 to 2006, Beatty coached Landstown High School in Virginia Beach. During his three-year tenure, Beatty led the team to three straight state championship games and a 40-2 record. The 2004 team won the Virginia 3-A state championship and earned a No. 9 national ranking with a 14-0 record, led by future college football and NFL player Percy Harvin.

During his tenure at the high school ranks, Beatty compiled a 78-18 record at three different high schools. Beatty was named the 2004 Virginia High School League AAA Coach of the Year for his state championship team with Landstown High. Also during his prep tenure, he coordinated offenses that produced the top four passers in Virginia High School history and led the only two teams in state history to have a 3,000-yard passer, a 1,000-yard receiver, and a 1,000-yard rusher in the same season.

=== Hampton University ===
Chris Beatty left Landstown High School for the offensive coordinator and quarterback coaching position at Virginia's Hampton University in 2006. Beatty only stayed at Hampton for the 2006 season, but his team produced a 10-2 record and lost to New Hampshire 41-38 in the first round of the FCS playoffs. The team also won the Mideastern Athletic Conference championship with a 6-1 conference record. Boasting the No. 7 scoring offense in the FCS at 34.2 points per game, the 2006 team also produced a player drafted in the 2007 NFL draft and six players who signed contracts with National Football League teams, four being offensive players coached by Beatty—including Dereck Faulkner, Onrea Jones and Marquay McDaniel.

=== Northern Illinois University ===
Following his 2006 stint at Hampton University, Beatty was offered and accepted the position as Northern Illinois' running backs coach for the 2007 season. Beatty's Huskies had previously had a player rush for over 1,000 yards in the previous eight seasons before his arrival, including the school leader and third-round NFL draft selection, Garrett Wolfe, who departed the team the season before Beatty's arrival.

In Beatty's only season at NIU, the Huskies posted a 2-10 record. However, sophomore running back Justin Anderson rushed for 1,245 yards and 8 touchdowns in the season under Beatty. The 1,000-yard performance extended the school's record to nine consecutive seasons.

=== West Virginia University ===
After his season at Northern Illinois University as the team's running backs coach, Beatty was offered the same position at West Virginia University for new head coach Bill Stewart. Beatty accepted the offer and entered the spring coaching the running backs, led by sophomore Noel Devine, and the slot receivers, led by sophomore Jock Sanders.

Devine rushed for more than 3,600 yards under Beatty's guidance, and twice earning All-Big East Conference honors. The fleet-footed Devine concluded his Mountaineer career with more than 4,000 rushing yards, ranking fourth all-time in Big East Conference history. Devine also finished as West Virginia's all-time leader in all-purpose yardage.

Sanders ranked as one of the Big East's most productive receivers, catching 195 passes with Beatty as his mentor. Sanders concluded his career as West Virginia's all-time leading receiver - and second all-time in the Big East. He also posted a reception in 41 consecutive games.

The Mountaineer rushing attack also ranked among the Big East's best during all three of Beatty's years with the program.

=== Vanderbilt University ===
In January 2011 Beatty was hired as wide receivers coach and recruiting coordinator at Vanderbilt University by new head coach James Franklin.

=== University of Illinois ===
On January 3, 2012 it was announced that Beatty was hired as assistant coach at the University of Illinois at Urbana–Champaign by new head coach Tim Beckman. On January 5, 2013, it was announced that Beatty would not be retained for the coming season.

=== University of Wisconsin ===
February 14, 2013 First-year Wisconsin head coach Gary Andersen hires Chris Beatty as the Badgers' wide receivers coach.

=== University of Virginia ===
On January 14, 2015, Beatty became the running backs coach at the University of Virginia. He was recently promoted to assistant head coach for offense.

=== Maryland ===
In 2016, Beatty joined the University of Maryland as their wide receivers coach. In 2017, he was promoted to associate head coach and in 2018, to co-offensive coordinator.

=== Pittsburgh ===
In 2019, Beatty joined the University of Pittsburgh as their wide receivers coach.

=== Los Angeles Chargers ===
In 2021, Beatty was hired by the Los Angeles Chargers as their wide receivers coach under head coach Brandon Staley.

=== Chicago Bears ===
In 2024, Beatty was hired by the Chicago Bears as their wide receivers coach under head coach Matt Eberflus. On December 2, 2024, Beatty was promoted to interim offensive coordinator under interim head coach Thomas Brown. On January 23, 2025, the Bears announced that they would not retain Beatty for the 2025 season.

=== Las Vegas Raiders ===
On February 6, 2025, the Las Vegas Raiders hired Beatty as their wide receivers coach.

== Coaching tree ==
=== Former prominent players coached ===
==== College ====
Player	Position	School	Year(s)
Nate Ilaoa	WR	N. Stafford HS	2000–2001
Percy Harvin	WR	Landstown HS	2003–2005
Dereck Faulkner	WR	Hampton	2006
Onrea Jones	WR	Hampton	2006
Marquay McDaniel	WR	Hampton	2006
Justin Anderson	RB	Northern Illinois	2007
Noel Devine	RB	West Virginia	2008–2010
Will Johnson	TE	West Virginia	2008–2010
Jock Sanders	RB-Slot WR	West Virginia	2008–2010
Tavon Austin	WR	West Virginia	2009–2010
Stedman Bailey	WR	West Virginia	2010
Jonathan Krause	WR	Vanderbilt	2011
Jordan Matthews	WR	Vanderbilt	2011
Nathan Scheelhaase	QB	Illinois	2012
Jared Abbrederis	WR	Wisconsin	2013
Taquan Mizzell	RB	Virginia	2015
D.J. Moore	WR	Maryland	2016-2017,2024-

== Personal life ==
Beatty and his wife, Kris, have a son, Aaron.
