= Percy Harvin =

American football player (born 1988)

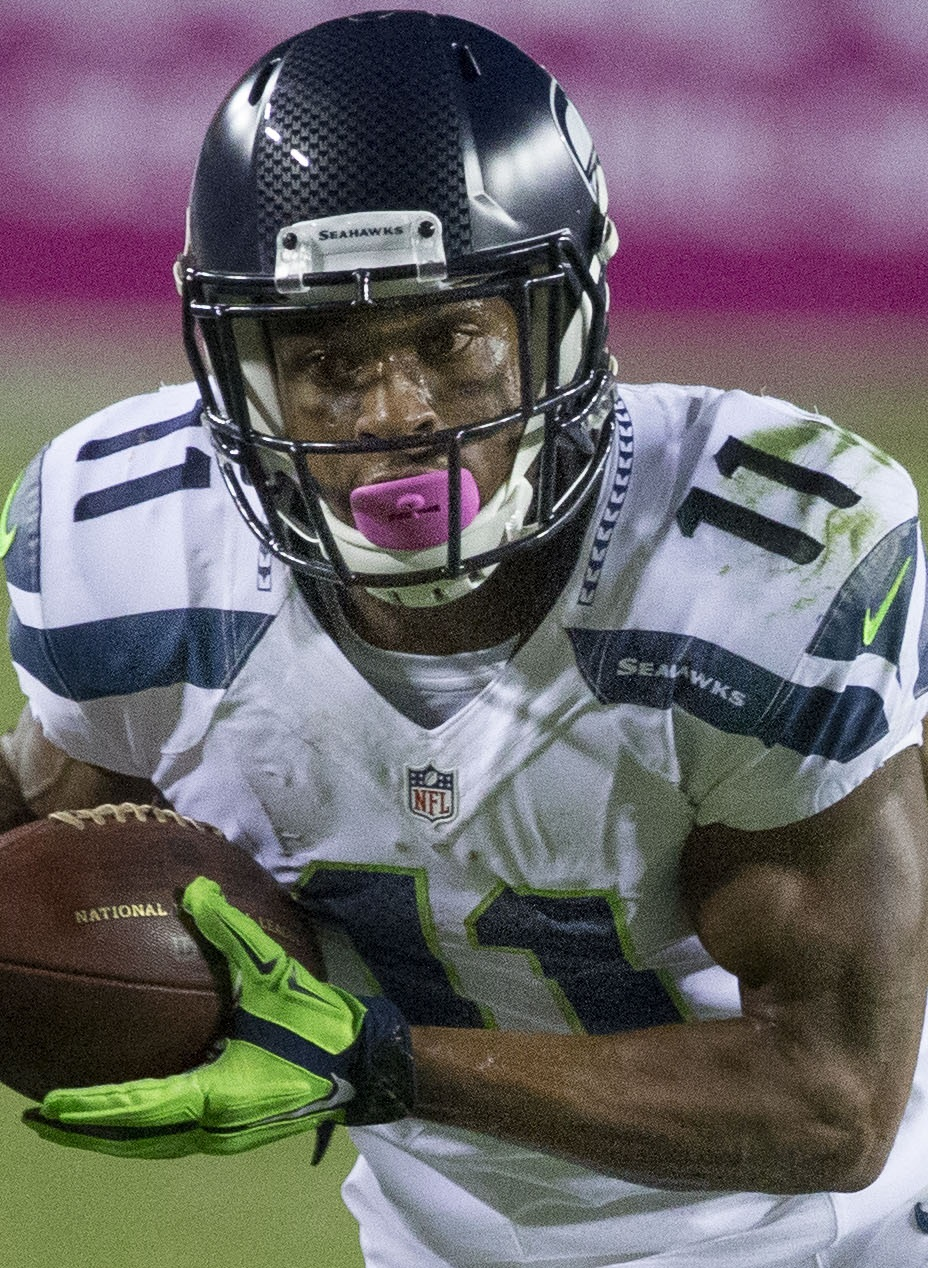
- Harvin with the Seattle Seahawks in 2014

No. 12, 11, 16, 18
- Position: Wide receiver

Personal information
- Born: May 28, 1988 (age 38); Chesapeake, Virginia, U.S.
- Listed height: 5 ft 11 in (1.80 m)
- Listed weight: 184 lb (83 kg)

Career information
- High school: Landstown (Virginia Beach, Virginia)
- College: Florida (2006–2008)
- NFL draft: 2009: 1st round, 22nd overall pick

Career history
- Minnesota Vikings (2009–2012); Seattle Seahawks (2013–2014); New York Jets (2014); Buffalo Bills (2015–2016)

Awards and highlights
- Super Bowl champion (XLVIII); NFL Offensive Rookie of the Year (2009); Pro Bowl (2009); PFWA All-Rookie Team (2009); Minnesota Vikings All-Mall of America Field Team; 2× BCS national champion (2006, 2008); 2× First-team All-American (2007, 2008); 2× First-team All-SEC (2007, 2008); SEC Freshman of the Year (2006)

Career NFL statistics
- Receiving yards: 4,026
- Receiving touchdowns: 22
- Rushing yards: 927
- Rushing touchdowns: 5
- Return yards: 4,127
- Return touchdowns: 5
- Stats at Pro Football Reference

William Percy Harvin III (born May 28, 1988) is an American former professional football player who was a wide receiver in the National Football League (NFL). He played college football for the Florida Gators, who won the BCS National Championship in 2006 and 2008. A two-time first-team All-American, he was selected by the Minnesota Vikings in the first round of the 2009 NFL draft. Harvin also played for the Seattle Seahawks, New York Jets and Buffalo Bills. He was named the Associated Press Offensive Rookie of the Year in 2009 and won Super Bowl XLVIII with the Seahawks in 2013 over the Denver Broncos. He attended and played football for Landstown High School in Virginia Beach, where his team won the high school state championship in 2004.

== Early life ==
Harvin was born to William Percy Harvin Jr. and wife Linda in Chesapeake, Virginia, where after his father's departure, he lived with his mother and his older sister, Lintera. His mother, Linda, ran a daycare out of their home as Harvin helped with the children. Harvin's mother ran track at Princess Anne High School in Virginia Beach and later coached an AAU track team. His sister, Lintera, ran track, both at Salem High School in Virginia Beach and at Eastern Michigan University. As a child, Harvin was a gifted athlete whose prowess was first noted as a six-year-old flag football participant. At the age of 13, he played for coach Bruce Pearl and the Virginia Beach Mustangs Pop Warner football team, leading the team to a national championship.

== High school career ==
At Landstown High School in Virginia Beach, Harvin was noted for his speed (4.32 seconds in the 40-yard dash as a freshman) and ability to make people miss in the open field. In 2003, during his sophomore year, the Landstown Eagles were the state Group AAA runner-up in football. A year later, Harvin led the Eagles' football team to a perfect 14–0 record and a Virginia High School League (VHSL) Group AAA Division 6 state championship. In the title game against James Robinson High School, Harvin accounted for 476 all-purpose yards in rushing, receiving, kick returns, and interception returns, as well as scoring five touchdowns in the 47–20 victory. In 2005, Landstown finished 13–1 after a 28–7 state championship game upset loss to Oakton High School of Vienna, Virginia. Following his stellar high school career, Harvin participated in the 2006 U.S. Army All-American Bowl. He also triumphed in basketball, where he helped the team to a 33–6 record and runner-up in the 2005 VHSL AAA state championship game.

After receiving National Junior Player of the Year honors in 2005, Harvin became one of the most highly acclaimed high school football players in the country. As one of the top recruits in the 2006 high school class, Harvin was ranked number one overall by Rivals.com and the number two receiver by Scout.com.

Despite his accomplishments, Harvin's high school athletic career was not without controversy. He served a one-game suspension early in his junior football season for unsportsmanlike conduct. As a senior, he was suspended for the final two regular-season games after making contact with an official and using inappropriate language during a game against First Colonial High School. In basketball, Harvin and a Green Run High School player were involved in a scuffle that prompted referees to stop the game with time remaining on the clock. As a result of this and prior incidents, Harvin was suspended from athletic competition by the VHSL.

Despite these missteps, Harvin ranks as one of the greatest high school athletes to come out of the Hampton Roads area. He scored 77 career touchdowns, accounted for more points than any player in South Hampton Roads history, and led Landstown High School to three consecutive Group AAA Division 6 state football championship games. As a junior Harvin led the Landstown basketball team to the state final, and became the first athlete since 1936 to win five gold medals at the state track meet. Despite several earlier statements that he would attend Florida State University, on December 19, 2005, Harvin committed to the University of Florida over Florida State, University of Miami (FL), University of Michigan, and University of Southern California.

=== Track and field ===
In 2000, at the age of 12, he was a member of the National Champion 4 × 100 m relay team in the Midget (11–12) Age Group. Harvin was also a standout track athlete at the Landstown High School. At the 2005 Virginia Class AAA state meet he became the first athlete in 69 years to capture five state titles, winning the 100 meters with a time of 10.69 seconds, 200 meters with a time of 21.59 seconds, long jump with a leap of 7.15 meters, and in triple jump with a leap of 14.50 meters. He captured the 2005 Virginia Class AAA indoor title in triple jump, with a leap of 14.70 meters. He also won the 2004 state title in long jump as a sophomore with a leap of 7.14 meters. As a result of various incidents, Harvin was suspended from athletic competition by the Virginia High School League (VHSL). The suspension prevented Harvin from competing in the VHSL Group AAA State Indoor Track Meet at George Mason University that year. His loss, after becoming the first athlete to win five state track titles in the same meet during his junior year, was a huge blow to his high school track team.

Harvin's personal bests are 10.43 seconds in the 100 meters, 21.19 seconds in the 200 meters, and 7.40 meters in long jump.

== College career ==
Harvin accepted an athletic scholarship to attend the University of Florida in Gainesville, Florida, where he played on coach Urban Meyer's Florida Gators football team from 2006 to 2008. Harvin had an immediate and dramatic impact for the Gators as a freshman in 2006, and was a key offensive player during the Gators' national championship season in 2008.

=== 2006 season ===
Harvin made his collegiate debut for the Florida Gators on September 2, 2006, against the Southern Mississippi Golden Eagles. Harvin was a dual threat, lining up at both running back and wide receiver. He caught three passes for 33 yards and carried the ball four times for a team-leading 58 yards. Harvin's second game was on September 9 against the Central Florida Golden Knights. He caught four passes for 99 yards, including a 58-yard touchdown pass. In the third and fourth games of the season, Harvin saw limited action against the Tennessee Volunteers, where he had one catch for 12 yards and one rush for 13 yards in the win. He was injured in the second quarter and thus played very little for the rest of the game and during practice the following week. A week later against the Kentucky Wildcats, Harvin had only one rush for two yards. Due to his injuries, Harvin did not play against the Alabama and played sparingly against LSU. He returned to the lineup for the Auburn game and continued his sporadic freshman year performance, rushing for a 42-yard touchdown against rival Florida State. However, Harvin suffered a neck sprain in the game and was taken off the field on a stretcher. Harvin returned the next week for the SEC Championship Game against Arkansas, by catching five passes for 62 yards and a touchdown. He also ran six times for a team high 105 yards, including a 67-yard touchdown run. With that performance, Harvin was named the game MVP. He finished off his freshman season with a win in the BCS National Championship Game against the Ohio State Buckeyes. In the game, Harvin lined up at quarterback numerous times, and was a factor in both the run game and the pass game with 22 yards rushing, 60 yards receiving, and a rushing touchdown. Despite his injury-plagued freshman season, Harvin was awarded SEC College Freshman of the year.

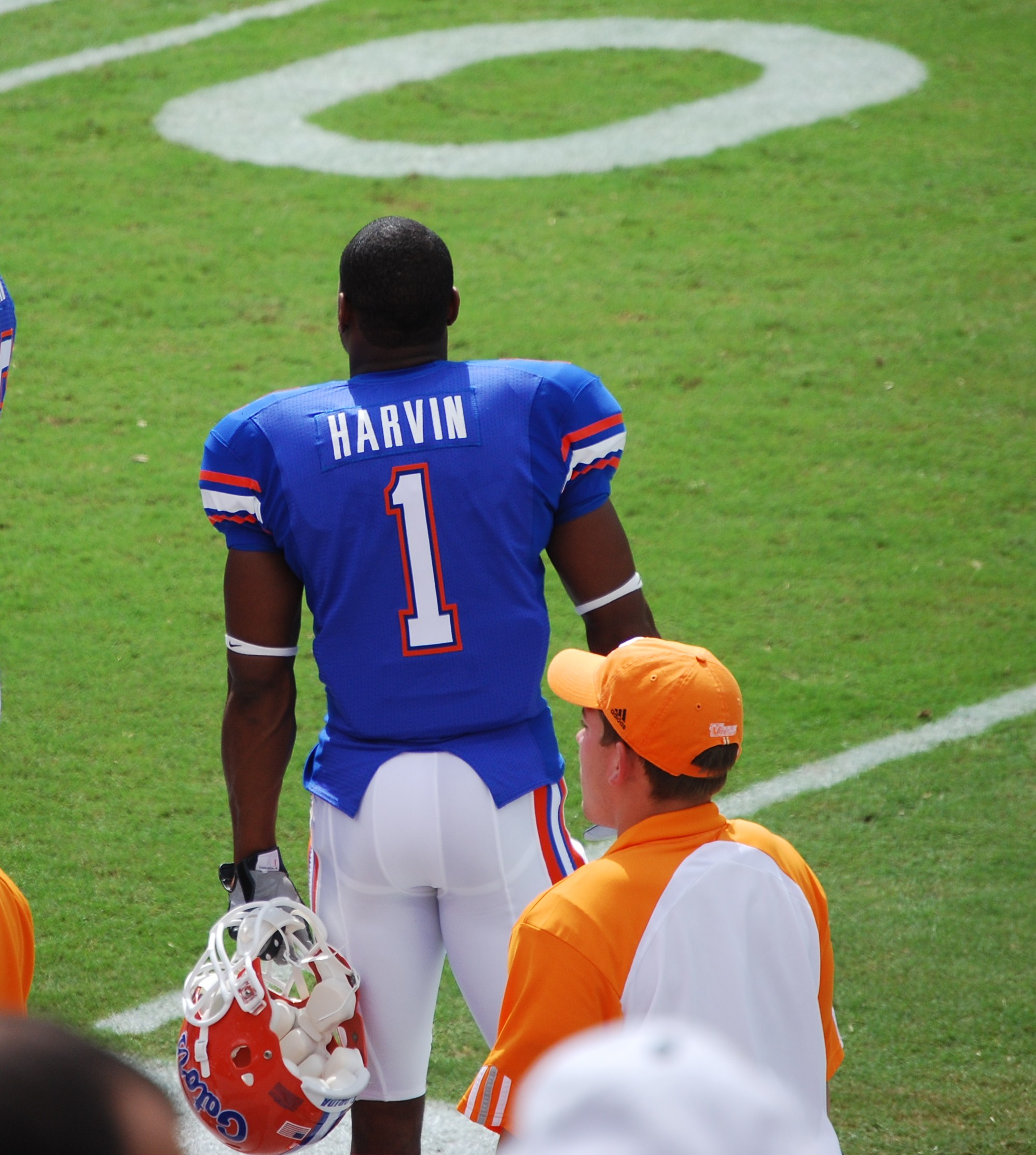
Harvin standing on the sidelines while playing for the Gators

=== 2007 season ===
Harvin entered the 2007 season as the starting receiver for the Gators. In the season opener, a 49–3 victory over Western Kentucky, Harvin recorded three receptions for 53 yards and a touchdown. A week later against Troy, Harvin recorded three receptions for 42 yards and a touchdown and also rushed for 56 yards on four carries. The next game, a blowout victory over Tennessee, Harvin contributed greatly with 120 yards on four receptions and 75 rushing yards with a touchdown. In the following game, Harvin grabbed 11 passes for 121 yards and a score in a 30–24 win over Ole Miss. In the Gators' first loss of the season to Auburn, Harvin recorded 119 yards on seven receptions. The game marked his third-consecutive 100-yard receiving game. The next three weeks resulted in modest numbers from Harvin, but he did go over 100 yards in either rushing or receiving. On November 3, Harvin had his best game of the season statistically, in a victory over Vanderbilt, when he recorded 110 receiving yards on nine receptions and 11 rushes for 113 yards and two rushing scores. After missing the following two victories with a sinus infection, Harvin returned with a 16 rush, 157 yard performance with a rushing touchdown against Florida State. The Gators took their 9–3 record to the Capital One Bowl in Orlando, where they lost to Michigan, 35–41. He put up monster numbers as he had nine receptions for 77 yards and a touchdown, also rushing for 165 yards and a score. He finished the season with 858 yards on 59 receptions for four touchdowns. He totaled 764 yards on 83 rushes for six touchdowns for a total of 1,622 yards from scrimmage and ten touchdowns, becoming the first receiver in University of Florida history to have over 1,000 yards rushing and receiving in his career. Harvin earned All-SEC first team honors as an all-purpose player, while earning second team honors as a receiver.

=== 2008 season ===
In the spring prior to his junior season, Harvin underwent arthroscopic heel surgery on his right heel to address the underlying issue that caused injury trouble throughout his career (achilles tendonitis, knee tendonitis, hip flexor, hamstring and quadriceps issues) dating back to his high school days in Virginia Beach. The surgery was performed by Dr. Robert Anderson of OrthoCarolina of Charlotte, North Carolina. Due to the invasive nature of the procedure, the recovery time was very long and associated with significant risk. Harvin used the recovery to his advantage though. Limited to on-field practice and running, he focused his efforts on getting stronger, increasing his weight to 205 pounds and notably increasing his bench press max to 405 pounds. In light of his increased strength and past production from the running back position, Florida head coach Urban Meyer officially announced his position had changed from wide receiver to running back, prior to the start of the season. However, Harvin continued to line up as a receiver for the Gators on a part-time basis. In fact, he was more of a full-time receiver than a running back.

Initially expected to be ready for the season opener against Hawaii, team doctors and the coaches felt he was not fully ready to play, and kept him out of the game. He made his season debut in the much anticipated game against Miami, seeing limited action he amassed 39 total yards on one reception and five carries, scoring a rushing touchdown. Later in the season, Harvin suffered another ankle injury in a game against Florida State on November 20. Harvin appeared to have suffered a high ankle sprain from a tackle and hobbled off the field, and did not return. This injury prevented him from playing in the SEC Championship on December 6 in which the Gators defeated Alabama 31–20. Going into the 2009 BCS National Championship Game against Oklahoma, Harvin had totaled 35 receptions for 595 yards and seven touchdowns, as well as 61 rushes for 538 yards and nine touchdowns. In the game, he accounted for nine carries for 122 yards with a touchdown, and five catches for 49 yards, playing on the injured ankle. Urban Meyer stated the day after the game that Harvin had suffered a hairline fracture in his lower right leg in addition to the high ankle sprain.

On January 15, 2009, Harvin announced he would forgo his remaining college eligibility and participate in the 2009 NFL draft. Harvin finished his college career as one of the most prolific offensive threats in school history. In three seasons, he totaled 133 catches for 1,929 yards and 13 touchdowns, while rushing the ball 194 times for 1,852 yards with 19 touchdowns. His 32 career touchdowns is the most ever by a University of Florida wide receiver. He averaged an astounding 9.5 yards per carry as a running back and averaged 11.6 yards overall (running back, receiver, return man). He was the first player in University of Florida history to rush for 100 yards and have 100 yards receiving in the same game (against Vanderbilt, 2007).

== Professional career ==
=== Pre-draft ===
In February 2009, Harvin tested positive for marijuana at the NFL Combine. Some teams reportedly removed him from their potential draft rosters.

Pre-draft measurables
Height	Weight	Arm length	Hand span	40-yard dash	10-yard split	20-yard split	Vertical jump	Broad jump	Bench press	Wonderlic
5 ft 11 1/8 in (1.81 m)	192 lb (87 kg)	31 5/8 in (0.80 m)	9 3/8 in (0.24 m)	4.41 s	1.47 s	2.51 s	37.5 in (0.95 m)	10 ft 1 in (3.07 m)	20 reps	12
Vertical, broad jump, and bench reps from Florida Pro Day. All others from NFL Combine

=== Minnesota Vikings ===
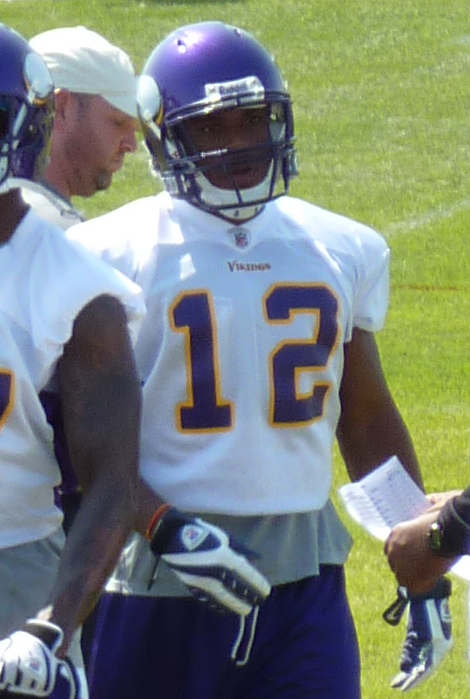
Harvin at the 2009 Vikings training camp

On April 25, 2009, Harvin was selected by the Minnesota Vikings with the 22nd overall pick in the first round of the 2009 NFL draft, the fourth wide receiver selected in the draft. Following extended contract negotiations, on August 3, 2009, Harvin signed a five-year contract worth up to $14.5 million, including $8.7 million in guarantees. Harvin wore jersey #12 for the Minnesota Vikings.

==== 2009 season ====
On April 30, 2009, while en route to a Minnesota Vikings rookie mini-camp, Harvin fell ill and was hospitalized prior to changing planes in Atlanta. He was released from the hospital the following day. Vikings coach Brad Childress said Harvin was dehydrated and had a virus. Additionally, Harvin did not participate in the 2009 NFL Rookie Symposium due to illness and also missed the team's first three practices and first two days of training camp at Minnesota State University, Mankato.

Harvin caught his first touchdown pass September 13, 2009, in the season opener against the Cleveland Browns, thrown by quarterback Brett Favre. He ended his first career NFL game with a total of 36 yards receiving and 22 yards rushing. On September 27, Harvin had a 101-yard kickoff return for a touchdown against the San Francisco 49ers. With this touchdown, Harvin became the first Viking ever to score a touchdown in each of his first three games as well as the second youngest player to return a kickoff for a touchdown in NFL history (21 years, 122 days). On October 25, 2009, Harvin had an 88-yard kickoff return for a touchdown against the Pittsburgh Steelers. Harvin did not play in the Vikings 30–10 victory over the Cincinnati Bengals in Week 14 due to migraine headaches, which also prevented him from practicing the following week. However, he did play in the Vikings week 16 overtime loss to the Chicago Bears, He finished the regular season with 60 receptions and eight touchdowns, two on kickoff returns, and a rushing average of nine yards per carry.

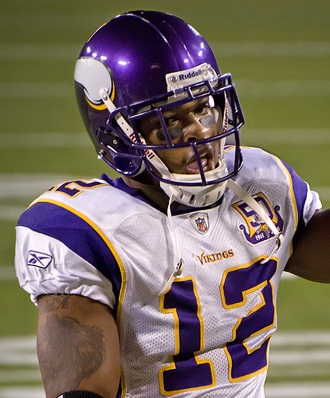
Harvin in 2010

On January 4, 2010, Harvin was a late addition to the 2010 Pro Bowl roster as a kick returner. Harvin filled a spot created because the Philadelphia Eagles's DeSean Jackson made the NFC team at two positions—wide receiver and kick returner. On January 6, the Associated Press announced Harvin's selection as the AP Offensive Rookie of the Year. Harvin is the sixth Vikings player to win the award, joining Adrian Peterson (2007), Randy Moss (1998), Sammy White (1976), Chuck Foreman (1973) and Paul Flatley (1963). On January 14, he was named Sporting News' 2009 NFL Rookie of the Year. Harvin later declined the offer to play in the Pro Bowl. He missed two postseason practices before the NFC Championship against the New Orleans Saints, due to migraine headaches. He ended up playing in the 31–28 overtime loss. After a stellar first year in the NFL, Harvin suffered a string of illnesses. On August 19, 2010, he passed out during practice due to a migraine attack and was taken to a local hospital in an ambulance. His heart stopped beating for a small moment but it was determined to be sleep apnea.

==== 2010 season ====
In Week 6, against the Dallas Cowboys, Harvin had a 95-yard kickoff return for a touchdown to start the second half in the 24–21 win. He won NFC Special Teams Player of the Week for his game against Dallas. In the 2010 season, Harvin had three games with at least 100 receiving yards and one game with two receiving touchdowns. In the 2010 season, Harvin finished with 71 receptions for 868 receiving yards and five receiving touchdowns to go along with a rushing touchdown and kickoff return touchdown.

==== 2011 season ====
On September 11, 2011, in the season opener against the San Diego Chargers, Harvin returned a 103-yard game opening kick off for a touchdown, setting a Vikings franchise record of four career kick off return touchdowns. On November 27, 2011, in a Vikings game against the Atlanta Falcons in Atlanta, Harvin returned a kickoff for 104 yards, to the Falcons 3-yard line. This was the longest non-scoring play in NFL history, a feat made again by Ameer Abdullah in 2015. However, the Vikings failed to score on the next 4 plays. Harvin led the Vikings with 87 receptions for the 2011 season. He scored six touchdowns and was active for all 16 games for the first (and only) time in his NFL career.

==== 2012 season ====
In the first six games of the 2012 season, Harvin had three games with over 100 yards receiving. He was named NFC Special Teams Player of the Month for September. On December 6, 2012, Harvin was placed on injured reserve with an ankle injury. Harvin's season ended with 62 receptions of 85 targets for 677 yards and three touchdowns. Harvin rushed for 96 yards on 22 attempts and one touchdown. He returned 16 kickoffs for 574 yards with one touchdown. He was ranked 90th by his fellow players on the NFL Top 100 Players of 2013.

=== Seattle Seahawks ===
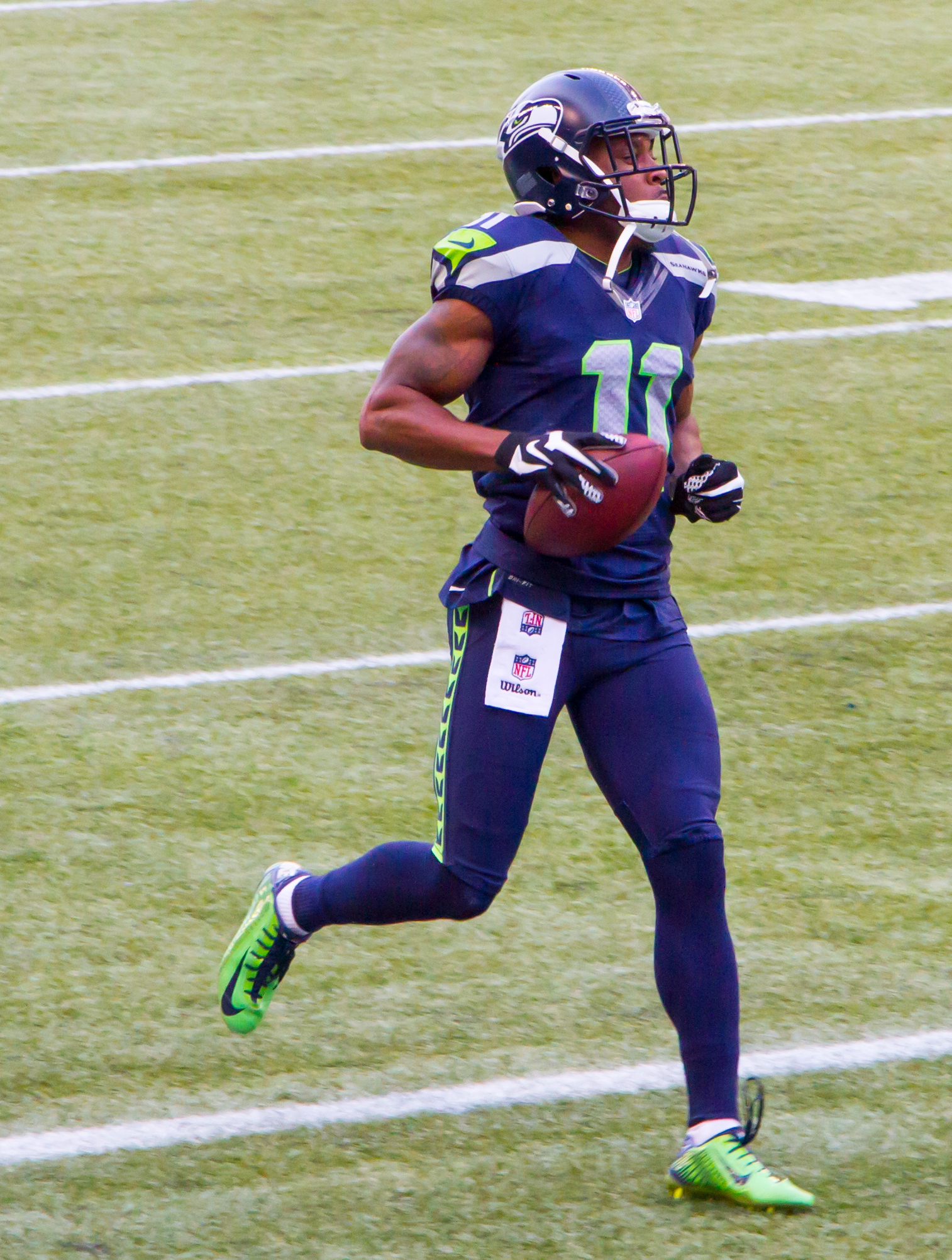
Harvin during the 2014 preseason

The Vikings traded Harvin to the Seattle Seahawks on March 11, 2013, in exchange for a first (Xavier Rhodes was selected with the pick) and seventh-round draft pick in the 2013 draft, and a third-round draft pick in the 2014 draft. Immediately after the Seahawks acquired Harvin, they signed him to a new six-year, $67 million contract with $25.5 million guaranteed. Harvin selected the number 11 to wear with the Seahawks, as the number 12 is retired for the Seahawks fanbase "The 12th Man". This trade reunited him with offensive coordinator Darrell Bevell, quarterback Tarvaris Jackson, and wide receiver Sidney Rice, all of whom he worked with during his time in Minnesota.

Harvin was diagnosed with a slight labrum tear in his hip while training during the offseason. On August 1, 2013, Harvin underwent successful hip surgery. On August 27, 2013, the Seahawks placed Harvin on the reserve/physically unable to perform list.

On November 11, 2013, the Seahawks activated Harvin from the reserve/physically unable to perform list. Harvin made his Seahawks debut during Week 11 against his old team, the Vikings, making one reception for 17 yards and a kick return for 58 yards. A week following his first game of the 2013 season, Harvin experienced inflammation in his recently surgically repaired hip which prevented him from playing. He was ruled out for Week 15 after dealing with soreness in the same hip on which he had surgery.

After not playing in the NFC Championship game due to a concussion, Harvin had 45 rushing yards and returned the opening kickoff of the second half of Super Bowl XLVIII 87 yards for his only touchdown of the season, helping the Seahawks win their first Super Bowl title.

Harvin allegedly had locker room altercations with teammates during his tenure with Seattle; also reported was that there were games where he sat himself down, refusing to go back on the field.

=== New York Jets ===
Harvin was traded to the New York Jets on October 17, 2014, for a conditional draft pick in the 2015 NFL draft. With the number 11 already taken and the number 12 retired for Joe Namath, Harvin wore the number 16. In his lone Jets season, Harvin recorded 29 receptions out of 52 targets for 350 yards with one touchdown and 110 rushing yards on 22 attempts. Harvin also had 20 kickoff returns for 495 yards. He was released on March 10, 2015, after the team traded for Brandon Marshall.

=== Buffalo Bills ===
==== 2015 season ====
On March 18, 2015, Harvin signed a one-year, $6 million contract with the Buffalo Bills. He was placed on injured reserve on November 7. Harvin's season ended with 19 catches on 30 targets for 218 yards and a touchdown with an additional 31 rushing yards on five attempts.

==== 2016 season ====
On April 15, 2016, Harvin announced his retirement from the NFL stating that he needed time to recover from injury but didn't rule out a possible return. On November 1, 2016, Harvin signed a one-year contract with the Buffalo Bills, coming out of retirement to re-join the team due to injuries to wideouts Sammy Watkins and Greg Salas.

On November 7, 2016, Harvin appeared in his first game of the season in a Monday Night Football game against his former team, the Seattle Seahawks. Harvin began to experience severe migraine headaches that kept him out two games and was placed on reserve/non-football illness list, ending his season early after coming out of retirement.

On March 14, 2017, Harvin announced his retirement from the NFL for the second time in his career.

== NFL career statistics ==
Legend
	Won the Super Bowl
**Bold**	Career high

=== Regular season ===
Year	Team	Games		Receiving					Rushing					Kick returns					Fumbles	
Year	Team	GP	GS	Rec	Yds	Avg	Lng	TD	Att	Yds	Avg	Lng	TD	Ret	Yds	Avg	Lng	TD	Fum	Lost
2009	MIN	15	8	60	790	13.2	51T	**6**	15	135	9.0	35	0	**42**	**1,156**	27.5	101T	**2**	1	0
2010	MIN	14	13	71	868	12.2	**53T**	5	18	107	5.9	17T	1	40	933	23.3	95T	1	1	1
2011	MIN	**16**	**14**	**87**	**967**	11.1	52T	**6**	**52**	**345**	6.6	39	**2**	16	520	32.5	104	1	**2**	**2**
2012	MIN	9	8	62	677	10.9	45	3	22	96	4.4	20	1	16	574	35.9	**105T**	1	**2**	1
2013	SEA	1	0	1	17	**17.0**	17	0	0	0	0.0	0	0	1	58	**58.0**	58	0	0	0
2014	SEA	5	4	22	133	6.0	33	0	11	92	8.4	**51**	1	12	283	23.6	46	0	**2**	1
2014	NYJ	8	8	29	350	12.1	45	1	22	110	5.0	13	0	20	495	24.8	65	0	1	0
2015	BUF	5	5	19	218	11.5	51T	1	5	31	6.2	9	0	5	108	21.6	25	0	1	0
2016	BUF	2	1	2	6	3.0	5	0	1	11	**11.0**	11	0	0	0	0	0	0	0	0
Career		75	61	353	4,026	11.4	53	22	146	927	6.3	51	5	147	4,127	27.2	105	5	10	5

=== Postseason ===
Year	Team	Games		Receiving					Rushing					Kick returns					Fumbles	
Year	Team	GP	GS	Rec	Yds	Avg	Lng	TD	Att	Yds	Avg	Lng	TD	Ret	Yds	Avg	Lng	TD	Fum	Lost
2009	MIN	**2**	1	**6**	**39**	**6.5**	**20**	0	**7**	38	5.4	14	0	**2**	33	16.5	17	0	**1**	**1**
2013	SEA	**2**	**2**	4	26	**6.5**	16	0	3	**54**	**18.0**	**30**	0	1	**87**	**87.0**	**87T**	**1**	0	0
Career		4	3	10	65	6.5	20	0	10	92	9.2	30	0	3	120	40.0	87	1	1	1

=== NFL records ===
- Longest non-scoring play: 104 (November 27, 2011, vs Atlanta Falcons)

=== Minnesota Vikings records ===
- Most career kickoff return touchdowns (5) (Tied with Cordarrelle Patterson)
- Most kickoff return touchdowns in a single season: 2 (2009) (Tied with Cordarrelle Patterson and Kene Nwangwu)

== Awards and honors ==
- Midget Age Group 4x100-meter relay national championship team (2000)
- Pop Warner Football national championship (2001)
- Virginia Beach District Offensive Player of the Year (2004)
- Virginia Eastern Region Offensive Player of the Year (2004)
- Rivals.com National High School Junior of the Year (2004)
- Parade High School All-American (2005)
- U.S. Army All-American Bowl participant (2006)
- Southeastern Conference (SEC) Freshman of the Year by Association Press (2006)
- SEC Championship Game Most Valuable Player (2006)
- SEC Championship (2006)
- Bowl Championship Series (BCS) National Championship (2006)
- Second-team All-SEC selection (wide receiver) by Associated Press and SEC coaches (2007)
- First-team All-SEC selection (all-purpose) by Associated Press (2007)
- First-team All-American (wide receiver) by The Sporting News (2007)
- SEC Championship (2008)
- BCS National Championship (2008)
- Second-team All-SEC selection (wide receiver) by Associated Press (2008)
- First-team All-SEC selection (wide receiver) by SEC coaches (2008)
- First-team All-SEC selection (all-purpose) by Associated Press (2008)
- First-team All-American (all-purpose) by American Football Coaches Association (AFCA) and Rivals.com (2008)
- Second-team All-American (all-purpose) by Associated Press (2008)
- Second-team All-American (wide receiver) by Walter Camp Football Foundation (2008)
- First-team All-American (wide receiver) by The Sporting News (2008)
- Pepsi NFL Rookie of the Week (Week 7, 2009)
- Pepsi NFL Rookie of the Week (Week 8, 2009)
- Pro Bowl kick returner (2010)
- Associated Press NFL Rookie of the Year Award (2009)
- All-Pro selection by The Sporting News (2009)
- Sporting News NFL Rookie of the Year (2009)
- Pepsi NFL Rookie of the Year (2009)
- Ranked No. 90 in the Top 100 Players of 2013

== See also ==
- 2006 Florida Gators football team
- 2007 College Football All-America Team
- 2008 College Football All-America Team
- 2008 Florida Gators football team
- List of Florida Gators football All-Americans
- List of Florida Gators in the NFL draft
- List of Minnesota Vikings first-round draft picks
