= Salem High School (Virginia Beach, Virginia) =

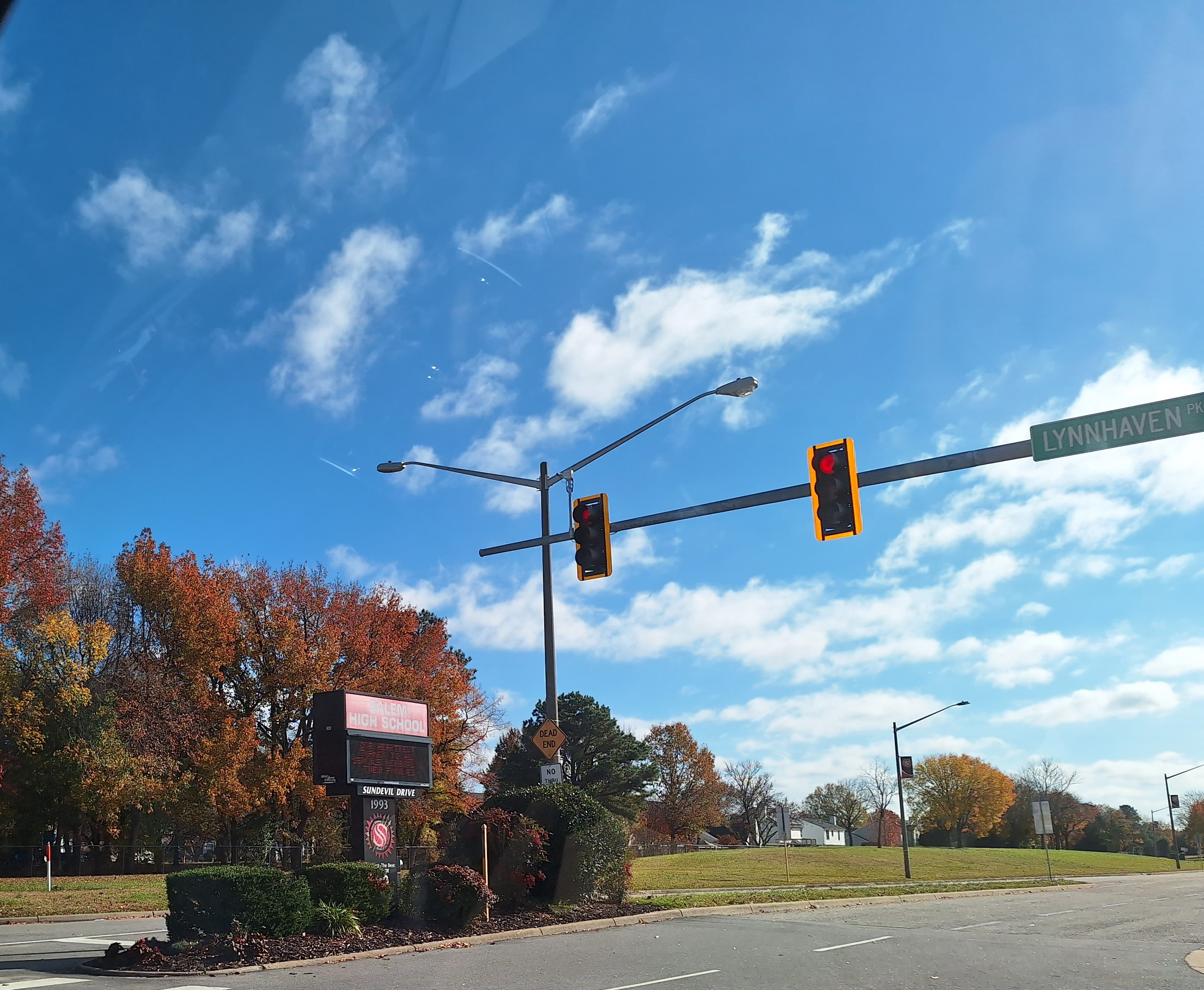

Location
- 1993 SunDevil Drive; Virginia Beach, Virginia 23464; United States; 36°47′0.8″N 76°8′38.2″W

Information
- School type: Public, high school
- Motto: Latin: Superbia et Excellentia (Pride and Excellence)
- Founded: 1989; 37 years ago
- School district: Virginia Beach City Public Schools
- Principal: Carey Manugo
- Teaching staff: 109.20 (FTE)
- Grades: 9-12
- Enrollment: 1,675 (2023–24)
- Student to teacher ratio: 15.34
- Colors: Scarlet, Black, Silver, and White
- Athletics conference: Virginia High School League; Beach District; Eastern Region
- Mascot: Sundevils
- Rivals: Bayside Marlins; Kellam Knights; Landstown Eagles
- Website: salemhs.vbschools.com

Salem High School is a secondary school located in Virginia Beach, Virginia.

The school has a Visual and Performing Arts Academy; one of eight magnet programs in Virginia Beach. Students throughout the city interested in these arts can apply. The class of 2008 is the first graduating class to include students from the academy.

== School history ==
Salem High School, located at 1993 Sundevil Dr (numbered in honor of the class of 1993), is built on a 50-acre (200,000 m^{2}) site acquired by the School Board in 1985. Construction of the 258,862-square-foot (24,049 m^{2}) building began in July 1987. The school, which contains 85 classrooms, an auditorium, a large lecture hall, a large gym, and two auxiliary gyms, opened on September 5, 1989, to a capacity enrollment of just over 2,000 students. A student committee selected the name, SunDevils, to represent Salem High School in the spring of 1989. The school colors are scarlet, black, silver, and white. A life-sized school mascot was unveiled during the 1991–1992 school year; "Sunny the SunDevil" (identical to the Tasmanian Devil from Warner Bros. Looney Tunes) is depicted on school sweatshirts and athletic programs. The Visual and Performing Arts Academy (VPAA) became an integral part of Salem High School in 2004. The student body had one of the largest number of Filipino-Americans in the city.

== Visual and Performing Arts Academy ==
The Visual and Performing Arts Academy at Salem High School (VPAA) consists of five strands: music (both vocal and instrumental), dance, theatre, and visual arts (photography, painting, drawing, etc.). While students typically select one strand as their concentration, they are also encouraged to explore areas outside their selected strand; all seniors participate in an inter-disciplinary final project.

Curricula includes instruction in performance, exhibition, theory, and history of the arts. Independent seminars and performances are also offered throughout the year.

Admission to the program is based on several criteria: an audition/portfolio evaluation, recommendations by core subject teachers as well as previous teachers in the arts, achievement as evidenced by honors or awards in the arts, and participation in extracurricular and community activities.

Noted accomplishments include the orchestra strands performances at Carnegie Hall in the years 2011 and 2016 under conductor Frank C. Garcia.

== Chorus department ==
The Salem High School choirs have received national recognition for their outstanding performances. Choirs from Salem have performed in the White House and National Cathedral (Washington, DC), Carnegie Hall (New York, NY), Walt Disney World (Orlando, FL), Universal Studios (Orlando, FL), Cardiff Cathedral (Cardiff, Wales, UK), and Westminster Abbey (London, England, UK). In addition, they have performed multiple times at the Virginia Music Educators Association annual in-service conference and the Southern Division convention of the Music Educators National Conference, and have been the featured ensemble at the Sweet Adelines International Mid-Winter convention. They have sung in a private performance for actor/singer Jimmy Dean and commissioned works from renowned composer Daniel E. Gawthrop. They have performed in concert with the Old Dominion University Concert Choir, the Christopher Newport University Choir, the Greensboro College Concert Choir, and the Virginia Commonwealth University "Commonwealth Singers." In recent years, they have been honored to work with such outstanding choral musicians as: Weston Noble, Eph Ely, Rodney Eichenberger, Jing Ling-Tam, Kevin Fenton, William Powell, Deen Entsminger, Rebecca Reames, and the world-famous ensemble, "Chanticleer."

The choirs have earned Grand Champion, Outstanding Ensemble, Best in Class, and First Place trophies as well as "Superior" ratings in competitive choral festivals in Orlando FL, Las Vegas NV, Atlanta GA, New York NY, Nashville TN, Gatlinburg TN, Richmond VA, Williamsburg VA, and Virginia Beach, VA, and have earned many "Superior" ratings at the VMEA District 2 choral festivals since the festival's inception (singing Grade VI music, the most challenging level recognized).

They have performed major works including Handel's "Messiah," Rutter's "Requiem," Bach's "Jesu, Meine Freude," Schubert's "Mass in G," and "Mass in F," Britten's "Ceremony of Carols," and Vivaldi's "Gloria."

Vocalists from Salem High School have been selected for the All-Virginia Choir every year since the school opened in 1989, and for the elite VMEA Senior Honors Chorus every year since 1990.

The Academy's most elite choir, Vox Harmonia, performed at the GQ Magazine Gentlemen's Ball in Fall 2008. They were invited by the famous music producer Timbaland and performed in front of him along with other celebrities such as Usher, Hilary Swank, Mark Wahlberg, Forest Whitaker, and James Cameron.

== Naval Junior Reserve Officer Training Corps ==
The NJROTC unit at Salem was established on July 1, 1996, under the authority of Title 10, United States Code, Chapter 102, Section 2031 to "...instill in students in United States secondary educational institutions the values of citizenship, service to the United States, and personal responsibility and a sense of accomplishment." The unit motto is "Do right and fear not".

The unit is a competitive force in Area 5, winning the Distinguished Unit Award for thirteen consecutive years. The unit has also received Unit Achievement once but once again achieving Distinguished Unit once more one year later and currently maintains their Distinguished Unit status to this day. The unit also received Distinguished Unit with Honors status for the first time in the 2017–18 school year. The units Drill, Athletics, and Academic team have been to Nationals three times in Pensacola, Florida, most recently placing seventeenth in the nation in the 2015–2016 school year.

== Academic departments ==
- Business
- Computer Resource
- English
- Fine Arts
- Foreign Language
- Gifted Program
- Guidance
- Health/P.E.
- Library/Media Center
- Marketing
- Math
- Naval Science (NJROTC)
- Science
- Social Studies
- Special Education
- Technology Education
- Work & Family Studies/Technology

== Advanced Placement courses ==
Salem High School offers the following Advanced Placement courses:

- English: Language and Composition
- English: Literature and Composition
- Statistics
- Calculus AB
- Calculus BC
- Computer Science
- Music Theory
- Environmental Science
- Biology
- Chemistry
- Human Geography
- Psychology
- Comparative Government
- European History
- United States Government and Politics
- United States History
- Art History
- Studio Art - 2D Design
- Studio Art - 3D Design
- Studio Art - Drawing
- French Language and Culture
- German Language and Culture
- Japanese Language and Culture
- Spanish Language and Culture
- Latin
- Spanish Literature

== Athletics ==
Varsity Fall	Junior Varsity Fall
Cross Country; Field Hockey; Football; Golf; Boys Volleyball; Girls Volleyball	Field Hockey; Football

Varsity Winter	Junior Varsity Winter
Boys Basketball; Girls Basketball; Gymnastics; Boys Indoor Track; Girls Indoor Track; Boys Swimming; Girls Swimming; Wrestling	Boys Basketball; Girls Basketball; Wrestling

Varsity Spring	Junior Varsity Spring
Baseball; Boys Outdoor Track; Girls Outdoor track Boys Soccer; Girls Soccer; Softball; Boys Tennis; Girls Tennis; Boys Lacrosse; Girls Lacrosse	Baseball; Softball; Boys Soccer; Girls Soccer

State Championships

- Boys Basketball: 2001
- Girls Basketball: 1994
- Girls Gymnastics: 1992
- Girls Volleyball: 1998

== Notable alumni ==
- Kaelon Black (born 2001), college football running back for the Indiana Hoosiers
- Isaiah Gardner (born 1985), defensive back of the Toronto Argonauts
- Jason Miyares (born 1976), Virginia State Legislator, Virginia House of Delegates, 2018 Legislator of the Year, current Attorney General of Virginia
- Timothy Mosley (a.k.a. Timbaland) (born 1972), producer, singer, and rapper
- Caroline Nichols (born 1984), U.S. Olympic Field Hockey player 2008
- Gene Elliott Thornton Jr. (a.k.a. No Malice) (born 1972), rapper, member of rap duo Clipse
- Terrence LeVarr Thornton (a.k.a. Pusha T) (born 1977), rapper, member of rap duo Clipse
