= Justin Anderson =

Justin Anderson may refer to:

- Justin Anderson (baseball) (born 1992), American baseball player
- Justin Anderson (basketball) (born 1993), American basketball player
- Justin Anderson (linebacker) (born 1991), American football linebacker
- Justin Anderson (offensive lineman) (born 1988), American football guard
- Justin Anderson (running back) (born 1986), American football running back for the Northern Illinois Huskies
- Justin Anderson (film director) (born 1967), British film director and screenwriter
