= Green Run, Virginia =

Green Run
- Community
- Location within the Commonwealth of Virginia Green Run (the United States)
- Coordinates: 36°47′54″N 76°05′31″W
- Country: United States
- State: Virginia
- Independent city: Virginia Beach
- Time zone: UTC−5 (Eastern (EST))
  - Summer (DST): UTC−4 (EDT)

Green Run is a nearly six-square mile area in central Virginia Beach, Virginia. The residential and commercial community was built as a Planned Unit Development (PUD) between 1968 and 1986.

It contains 36 neighborhoods, including 4200 single-family homes, townhouses, three condominium projects, and three apartment communities with roughly 900 apartments. According to 2024 census figures, over 16,664 residents live within Green Run.

== Community leadership ==
Green Run Homes Association is run by a nine-member governing board which serves as its legislative body. Board members are elected to staggered three-year terms, and three of the nine Board members are elected each year. The President shall preside at all meetings of the Board of Directors; shall see that orders and resolutions of the Board are carried out; shall sign all leases, mortgages, deeds and other written instruments and shall cosign all promissory notes.

Day-to-day operations of the Association are carried out by the Community Manager who is appointed by the governing Board and acts as chief operating officer. The Community Manager supervises the Association's 20 employees and serves as a principal contact for residents.

In the past, the President of the governing Board took the position of Chief Executive Officer as well as Board President. This conflict of interest raised concerns among the membership. This member no longer serves on the Board or works at the association.

== Facilities and amenities ==
The Association maintains a community center, four recreation centers with swimming pools and tennis courts, 14 parks and playgrounds, an athletic complex, and roughly 200 acres (0.81 km^{2}) of common area or "green belt" including 5.5 miles (8.9 km) of canals with 11 miles (18 km) of shoreline.

== Programs and events ==
Green Run has a wide array of programs and events for residents of all ages. These include quarterly seniors dinners, youth sports programs, annual Easter Egg Hunt, pool parties. In 2006, the association partnered with now State Delegate Sal Iaquinto and former Attorney General, now Governor, Bob McDonnell to create "Safe Kids Day", an annual event that promotes child safety for residents. A Teen Council was started in 2006 to enable youths to participates in community volunteer activities, and Green Run has the largest Neighborhood Watch program in Virginia Beach.

The annual Fall Cook-Out, begun in 2005, has quickly become a popular tradition and has an annual attendance of nearly 800 residents. The annual event give residents an opportunity to eat, listen to great local music, and connect with neighbors from across the community. Residents are also able to network with Association leaders and staff along with city, state, and federal officials. Attendees often include the mayor, members of City Council, Fire Chief, Chief of Police, representatives from city departments, state officials, and former Congresswoman Thelma Drake.

To encourage civic involvement, Green Run's Association hold periodic town hall meetings with city and state officials on topics of interest to residents, and has begun sponsoring a voter registration initiative.

== Volunteers ==
Green Run's governing board no longer regularly meets with residents. In January 2011 a 48% increase in assessments led to resident unrest, and after the membership voiced their objections all scheduled monthly homeowners forums were cancelled.

In 2007, volunteers planted over 50 trees throughout the community on Arbor Day. Green Run has adopted several streets and parks within the community through the city's "adopt-a-street" and "adopt-a-spot" programs. Volunteers clean these areas at least one every month, rather than once-every-six-months as required by the program. Green Run also serves as "Partners in Education" with three local elementary schools and regularly sends volunteers to assist these schools.

== Media coverage ==
Green Run has received a very positive attention to its many programs, both from residents and the press. During 2006, WTKR-TV 3 ran a series of stories on Green Run, and during 2007, the Virginian-Pilot’s "At Home Section" ran a very positive profile on the neighborhood, although there is an average of at least 6 homicides or suicides annually, as well as dozens of attempts, along with hundreds of robberies, beatings, drug-trades, and other illegal activities.

== Schools ==
The community is served by three elementary schools: Green Run Elementary School, Rosemont Elementary School, and Parkway Elementary School; two middle schools: Landstown Middle School and Larkspur Middle School; and two high schools: Green Run High School and Landstown High School, and Tidewater Community College.

== Elected officials ==
Green Run's representative to City Council is Michael Berlucchi who is elected from the Rose Hall District. Green Run's School Board representative is Jessica L. Owens. Green Run is represented in the Virginia General Assembly by Delegate Glenn Davis and Senator John Cosgrove. Green Run is represented in the United States Congress by Congresswoman Elaine Luria.
