= Isaiah Gardner =

American gridiron football player (born 1985)

No. 36
- Position: Cornerback

Personal information
- Born: January 16, 1985 (age 41); Detroit, Michigan, U.S.
- Listed height: 5 ft 11 in (1.80 m)
- Listed weight: 197 lb (89 kg)

Career information
- High school: Salem (Virginia Beach, Virginia)
- College: Maryland
- NFL draft: 2008: undrafted

Career history
- Jacksonville Jaguars (2008); Edmonton Eskimos (2010)*; Toronto Argonauts (2011)*
- * Offseason or practice squad member only
- Stats at Pro Football Reference

Isaiah Gardner (born January 16, 1985) is an American former professional football cornerback. He was signed by the Jacksonville Jaguars as an undrafted free agent in 2008. He played college football at Maryland.

== College career ==
Gardner played college football for the University of Maryland, College Park after transferring from the University of Notre Dame after his freshman year.

== Professional career ==
=== Jacksonville Jaguars ===
On April 27, 2008, he signed as an undrafted free agent with the Jacksonville Jaguars. After making the team following the preseason, he was inactive for the regular season opener against the Tennessee Titans on September 7. He was waived two days later after offensive tackle Chad Slaughter was signed, but re-signed to the practice squad the following day.

Gardner was promoted to the active roster on October 4 when offensive tackle Todd Wade was released. The Jaguars waived Gardner on October 25 to make room for safety Chad Nkang. Gardner was subsequently re-signed to the practice squad.

Gardner was again promoted to the Jaguars' active roster on December 10. He was waived again on December 22 and re-signed to the practice squad.

The Jaguars waived Gardner on May 4, 2009.

=== Edmonton Eskimos ===
On May 7, 2010, Gardner signed with the Edmonton Eskimos of the Canadian Football League. He was later released by the team on June 5, 2010.

=== Toronto Argonauts ===
On April 21, 2011, Gardner signed with the Toronto Argonauts of the Canadian Football League. He was released by the team on May 27, 2011.

Victaulic Company of America

2018 - Hired to Fire Protection Sales active roster and is an active midget wrestler fanatic.
