= Todd Wade =

American football player and real estate investor (born 1976)

No. 71, 74
- Position: Offensive tackle

Personal information
- Born: October 30, 1976 (age 50); Greenwood, Mississippi, U.S.
- Listed height: 6 ft 8 in (2.03 m)
- Listed weight: 303 lb (137 kg)

Career information
- High school: Jackson Prep (MS)
- College: Mississippi
- NFL draft: 2000: 2nd round, 53rd overall pick

Career history
- Miami Dolphins (2000–2003); Houston Texans (2004–2005); Washington Redskins (2006–2007); Jacksonville Jaguars (2008)

Awards and highlights
- PFWA All-Rookie Team (2000); Second-team All-American (1999); First-team All-SEC (1999)

Career NFL statistics
- Games played: 99
- Games started: 96
- Fumble recoveries: 3
- Stats at Pro Football Reference

Todd McLaurin Wade (born October 30, 1976) is an American former professional football player who was an offensive tackle in the National Football League (NFL). He was selected by the Miami Dolphins in the second round of the 2000 NFL draft. He played college football for the Ole Miss Rebels.

Wade also played for the Houston Texans, Washington Redskins and Jacksonville Jaguars. Including the playoffs, Wade played in 102 NFL games.

== Early life ==
Wade was born in Greenwood, Mississippi, and played high school football at Jackson Preparatory School in Jackson, Mississippi.

== College career ==
Wade went on to be a four-year letterman and three-year starter at the University of Mississippi. He started 32 of the 44 games in which he played during his career, including starts in each of his final 32 collegiate games. He also opened all 11 contests at right tackle his senior season and was a first-team All-SEC choice and a second-team All-American selection.

== Professional career ==
=== Miami Dolphins ===
Wade was drafted in the second round of the 2000 NFL draft by the Miami Dolphins where he played for four seasons, starting in 63 regular season games, as well as three playoff games. He started all 16 games as a rookie from the right tackle position, plowing the way for Lamar Smith to break the 1,000 yard barrier and helping to restrict the opposition to only 28 sacks. Wade was a member of the NFL All-Rookie Team as well as Offensive Rookie of the Month of October. In 2001, he started 15 games, missing only one game due to injury. He helped Smith lead the Dolphins in rushing and again limited the opposing defenses to sack the Dolphins quarterbacks under 30 times. In 2002, Wade again anchored the right side of the offensive line, starting all 16 games. He was instrumental in paving the way for Ricky Williams to gain an NFL leading 1,853 yards while only allowing 25 sacks throughout the season. In 2003, Williams again broke the 1,000 yard barrier behind Wade, who started all 16 games for Miami. Miami cruised to an overall 41–23 record with one of the best running backs in football and Wade on the roster, twice making the playoffs. In his four seasons, the Dolphins allowed an average of 28 sacks per season and on three occasions boasted a 1,000 yard rusher.

=== Houston Texans ===
Wade signed as a free agent with the Houston Texans prior to the 2004 season and he started thirteen games missing three due to a high ankle sprain he suffered against Minnesota. He started in nine games in the 2005 season but then suffered a torn knee ligament in Week 11 and was placed on injured reserve. According to ESPN on July 14, 2006, Wade was released by the Texans while recovering from his knee injury. Per ESPN he never lived up to expectations to bolster the Houston offensive line which were symbolic of the longstanding problems of a porous Texans offensive line. He made it just two injury plagues seasons before he was released."

=== Washington Redskins ===
Wade signed with the Washington Redskins as a reserve linemen in 2006. Wade resigned to a 3-year extension following the 2006. In the 2006 season Wade started only one game in week 15 and had not played since November 13, 2005. He rotated into the starting position in the 2007 season when starter Jon Jansen was injured early, but according to the Washington Post eventually lost the job to Stephon Heyer in week 14. He was released by the Redskins in the 2008 pre-season following a leg injury in a game against the Indianapolis Colts.

=== Jacksonville Jaguars ===
Wade signed with the Jacksonville Jaguars on the practice squad on September 10, 2008, after guard Maurice Williams was placed on injured reserve. He was released on October 4 when the team promoted cornerback Isaiah Gardner to the active roster.

== Political career ==
=== State Senate Campaign ===
In 2011, Wade ran for Mississippi State Senate as the Republican nominee for MS-9. However, due to a residency requirement, Wade was removed from the ballot. In a Mississippi election, a candidate is required to have been registered to vote in the state for four years in order to hold public office. However, the Lafayette County voter rolls indicated that Wade was not registered in the state of Mississippi until September 2010. Wade moved to Mississippi one year earlier after a nine-year NFL career.

=== Mayoral Campaign ===
Wade ran for Mayor of the college town of Oxford, Mississippi as an Independent. Wade lost the Mayoral Election to incumbent George "Pat" Patterson 2,122 votes to 1,220 votes.
