= Tallwood High School =

Location
- 1668 Kempsville Road; Virginia Beach, Virginia 23464; United States; 36°47′7.3″N 76°10′56.6″W

Information
- School type: Public, high school
- Founded: 1992
- School district: Virginia Beach City Public Schools
- Superintendent: Donald E. Robertson
- Principal: Ryan O'Meara
- Staff: 187
- Teaching staff: 116.60 (FTE)
- Grades: 9-12
- Enrollment: 1,875 (2023–24)
- Student to teacher ratio: 16.08
- Language: English
- Colors: Purple, Gold, White, and Silver
- Athletics conference: Virginia High School League; Beach District; Class 5 Region A
- Mascot: Lions
- Website: Official site

Tallwood High School is a secondary school in southwest Virginia Beach, Virginia. It was built on the site of an old colonial plantation whose manor house was Tallwood, hence the name of the school. Tallwood was remodeled during 2004–2005.

One of the school's most remarkable features is the Global Studies and World Languages Academy. It's one of several magnet programs in Virginia Beach. Students throughout the city interested in studying global issues and foreign languages can apply.

== Debate ==
In 2000, 2001, 2003, and 2004, members of Tallwood's Debate team won the VHSL State Championships in AAA. Deborah Plummer.

- In the 1999-2000 VHSL State Debate Tournament, Tallwood's Four Person Policy Debate squad won the AAA championship. In the 2000-2001 VHSL State Debate Tournament, Tallwood's Four Person Policy Debate squad achieved a repeat AAA championship.
- In the 2001-2002 VHSL State Debate Tournament, Tallwood's Affirmative Policy Debate team competed in the AAA group and was awarded the first place speaker award after receiving first-place team awards at District and Regional tournaments.

== Sports ==
- Tallwood's Boys Volleyball Team won the state championship in 2004.

== Notable alumni ==
- Alex Askew, Virginia state delegate
- Kelly Convirs-Fowler, Virginia state delegate
- Michael Feggans, Virginia state delegate
- Chad Hartigan, film director
- Valerie LaPointe, animator and film director

== See also ==
- AAA Eastern Region
- AAA Beach District
