= Plaxico Burress =

American football player (born 1977)

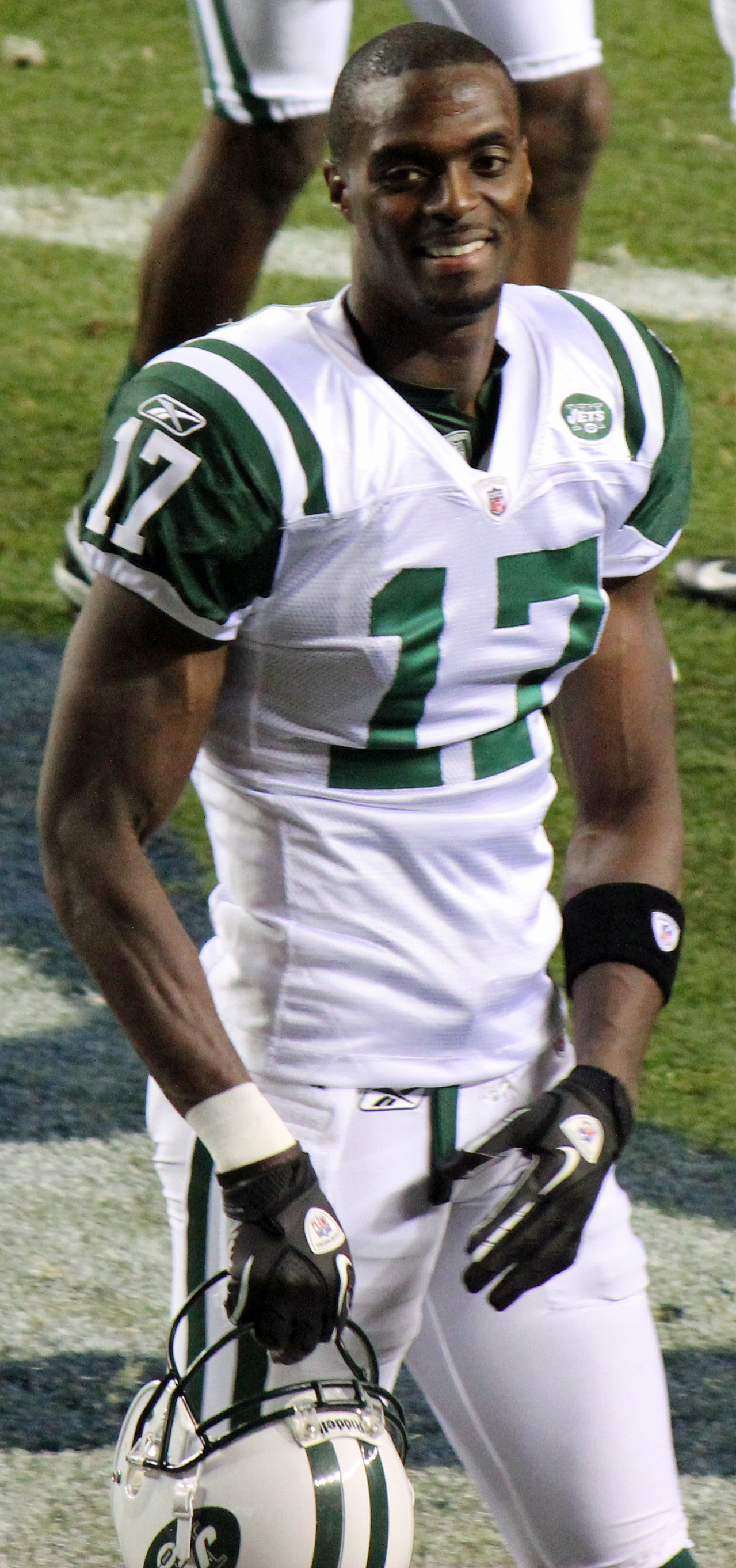
- Burress with the New York Jets in 2011

No. 80, 17
- Position: Wide receiver

Personal information
- Born: August 12, 1977 (age 49); Norfolk, Virginia, U.S.
- Listed height: 6 ft 5 in (1.96 m)
- Listed weight: 232 lb (105 kg)

Career information
- High school: Green Run (Virginia Beach, Virginia) Fork Union Military Academy (Fork Union, Virginia)
- College: Michigan State (1996–1999)
- NFL draft: 2000: 1st round, 8th overall pick

Career history

Playing
- Pittsburgh Steelers (2000–2004); New York Giants (2005–2008); New York Jets (2011); Pittsburgh Steelers (2012–2013)

Coaching
- Arizona Cardinals (2017) Coaching intern

Awards and highlights
- Super Bowl champion (XLII); 46th greatest New York Giant of all-time; First-team All-Big Ten (1999); Second-team All-Big Ten (1998)

Career NFL statistics
- Receptions: 553
- Receiving yards: 8,499
- Receiving touchdowns: 64
- Stats at Pro Football Reference

Plaxico Antonio Burress (born August 12, 1977) is an American former professional football player who was a wide receiver for 12 seasons in the National Football League (NFL). He played college football for the Michigan State Spartans, and was selected by the Pittsburgh Steelers with the eighth overall pick in the 2000 NFL draft. He also played for the New York Giants and the New York Jets, and he caught the game-winning touchdown in Super Bowl XLII as the Giants beat the then-undefeated New England Patriots.

== Personal life ==
Plaxico Burress was born to Vicki Burress in Norfolk, Virginia. He was named after his uncle, has two brothers, and has been married to Tiffany Glenn since July 2005. They have one son, Elijah and a daughter, Giovanna, born November 2009. Burress graduated from Green Run High School in Virginia Beach, Virginia in 1996 and spent a post-graduate year at Fork Union Military Academy in Fork Union, Virginia. He lives in Totowa, New Jersey. His son was rated a four-star receiver by 24/7 Sports and ESPN, and he plays at Notre Dame.

== College career ==
Burress played two seasons for Michigan State, recording consecutive 1000 yard receiving seasons in 1998 and 1999. In 1998, he caught 65 passes for 1,013 yards and eight touchdowns. The following season, he recorded 66 receptions for 1,142 yards and 12 touchdowns and earned first-team All-Big Ten honors.

In 1999, Burress set a then-school record with 255 receiving yards on ten catches against Michigan. He ended his college career with 13 receptions for 185 yards and three touchdowns against Florida in the 2000 Citrus Bowl.

== Professional career ==
=== 2000 NFL Combine ===
Pre-draft measurables
Height	Weight	Arm length	Hand span	40-yard dash	Vertical jump	Broad jump
6 ft 5 3/8 in (1.97 m)	231 lb (105 kg)	33 3/4 in (0.86 m)	9 1/2 in (0.24 m)	4.59 s	33.0 in (0.84 m)	9 ft 7 in (2.92 m)
All values from NFL Combine

=== Pittsburgh Steelers ===
After being selected in the first round with the eighth overall pick in the 2000 NFL draft, Burress went on to play five years with the Pittsburgh Steelers, amassing 261 receptions for 4,164 yards, 22 touchdowns, and six fumbles over the span of 71 games. Burress was featured on the MTV show True Life, documenting his rookie season. His rookie season saw him on the wrong end of one of the NFL's most infamous gaffes.

In a game the Steelers eventually won 24–13, Burress caught a 19-yard reception, with his momentum causing him to fall to his knees. The rookie Burress then spiked the ball, believing the play was dead (since that is the rule in the NCAA but not the NFL) but, since he was not touched while he was on the ground, the ball was still live—allowing the Jaguars' Danny Clark to recover the fumble and run 44 yards with it.

He first broke the 1,000-yard mark in his second season, gaining 1,008 yards on 66 receptions. Burress's best season with the Steelers came in 2002, when he set his career highs for receptions (78) and yards (1,325), to go along with seven touchdowns. Burress's 1,008-yard season in 2001, combined with Hines Ward's 1,003 receiving yards, gave the Steelers their first pair of 1,000-yard receivers. The two would combine to accomplish the same feat in 2002.

In 2002, Burress appeared in all 16 regular season games and caught a career high 78 passes. On November 10, 2002, Burress took advantage of an extra 15 minutes of play to set a Steelers' franchise record with 253 receiving yards in a 34–34 tie against the Atlanta Falcons. He caught nine passes and scored two touchdowns in the game, and nearly won it but was stopped at the 1-yard line as time expired. Also in 2002, Burress played in his first career playoff game, accumulating six receptions for 100 yards and a touchdown. He finished the season with another career high 1,325 receiving yards and seven touchdowns.

He finished 2003 catching 60 passes for 860 yards and four touchdowns as the Steelers went 6-10 and missed the playoffs. In 2004, Burress caught 35 passes on 60 targets for 698 yards and 5 touchdowns through the regular season. He got his first career playoff win when the Steelers defeated the New York Jets in the AFC Divisional playoff game 20-17. During the game, he caught two passes on seven targets for 28 yards. He scored a touchdown in his first and only AFC Championship appearance on a seven yard pass from Ben Roethlisberger as the Steelers ended their season losing to eventual Super Bowl champions the New England Patriots.

=== New York Giants ===
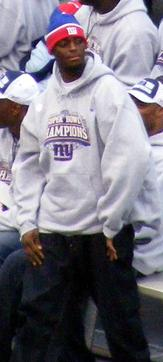
Burress at the Giants' Super Bowl champions parade in NYC

On January 23, 2005, after the playoff defeat to the Patriots, Burress announced his intentions to leave the Steelers. On March 17, he signed a six-year, $25 million contract with the New York Giants.

In his first season with the Giants, Burress caught 76 passes for 1,214 yards, helping the team earn an 11–5 record and first place in the NFC East as well as the NFC's fourth seed. However, they were shut out 23–0 by the Carolina Panthers in the opening round of the 2005–06 NFL playoffs.

In the 2006 season, Burress got his highest career total of ten touchdowns but fell short of the 1,000-yard mark, appearing in only 15 games and struggling with a groin injury for much of the year. The Giants lost six of their last eight games and fell in the NFC Wild Card playoffs to the NFC East champion Philadelphia Eagles 23–20. Burress had a touchdown catch on the opening drive and finished the game with five receptions for 89 yards and two touchdowns.

In 2007, Burress was the Giants' top receiver with 70 receptions for 1,025 yards, despite not practicing all season because of his ailing ankle. He also set a franchise playoff record in the NFC title game in Green Bay with 11 receptions for 154 yards as the Giants advanced to Super Bowl XLII.

In Super Bowl XLII, Burress caught the game-winning touchdown pass that made the score 17–14 in the Giants' favor over the undefeated (18–0) New England Patriots. He gained a measure of "Super Bowl legend" by predicting the Patriots would lose by the score 23–17.

Before their May minicamp, Burress and his teammates were invited by then-President George W. Bush to the White House on April 30, 2008, to honor their victory in Super Bowl XLII.

Just before the start of the Giants' mandatory May minicamp, Burress had said that he would not participate in the camp because he was upset with his contract. He attended the camp to avoid paying a fine but refused to practice with the team. Although he was slated to receive $3.25 million for 2008, Burress felt underpaid compared to other star receivers. After indicating that he might hold out training camp as well, he joined, but practiced very little, claiming his ankle was injured.

In September 2008, Burress did not show up for work on a Monday and could not be reached by phone for two days. On September 24, 2008, the team announced that Burress would be suspended for the game on October 5 for a violation of team rules.

This was not the first time that Burress had been temporarily suspended by an NFL team—in May 2004, he was suspended by the Pittsburgh Steelers for failing to show up for a Monday team practice. On October 24, the NFL fined Burress a total of $45,000 for the following conduct:

1. $20,000 for postgame comments regarding officiating—specifically, inappropriate comments on officiating.
2. $20,000 for unsportsmanlike conduct—specifically, verbal abuse of the head linesman.
3. $5,000 for throwing the ball in the stands.

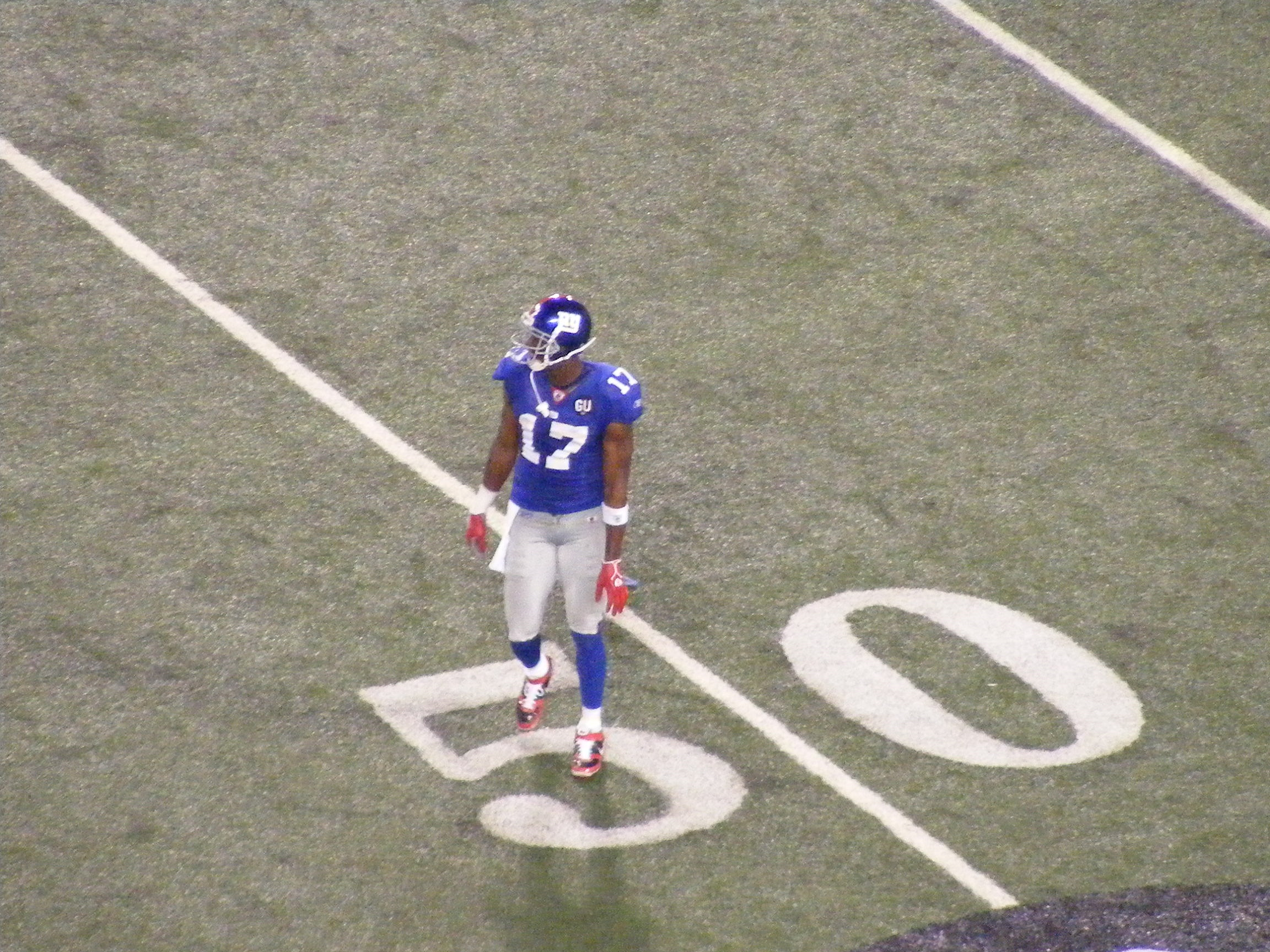
Burress with the Giants in 2008

Burress signed a five-year, $35 million contract extension prior to the season. However, it was an incentive-laced deal, with $11.5 million in non-guaranteed base salaries in the contract, non-guaranteed roster bonuses of $3.5 million, non-guaranteed escalators of $5 million based on performance and $1.3 million in non-guaranteed workout bonuses among other things. According to various reports, the Giants would be able to cut or trade Burress after the season and get $23 million taken off their books.

On November 2, in the second quarter of the Giants' ninth regular season game against the Dallas Cowboys, Burress caught his 500th career reception. On November 23, 2008, Burress started the game against the Arizona Cardinals in Arizona after being considered questionable with a hamstring injury. The first play of the game he had a 4-yard reception but it was called back on a penalty. Burress left the game and did not return in what would be his final appearance with the Giants.

Burress was released by the Giants on April 3, 2009, when it was apparent his accidental shooting court case would take longer than expected to resolve.

=== New York Jets ===
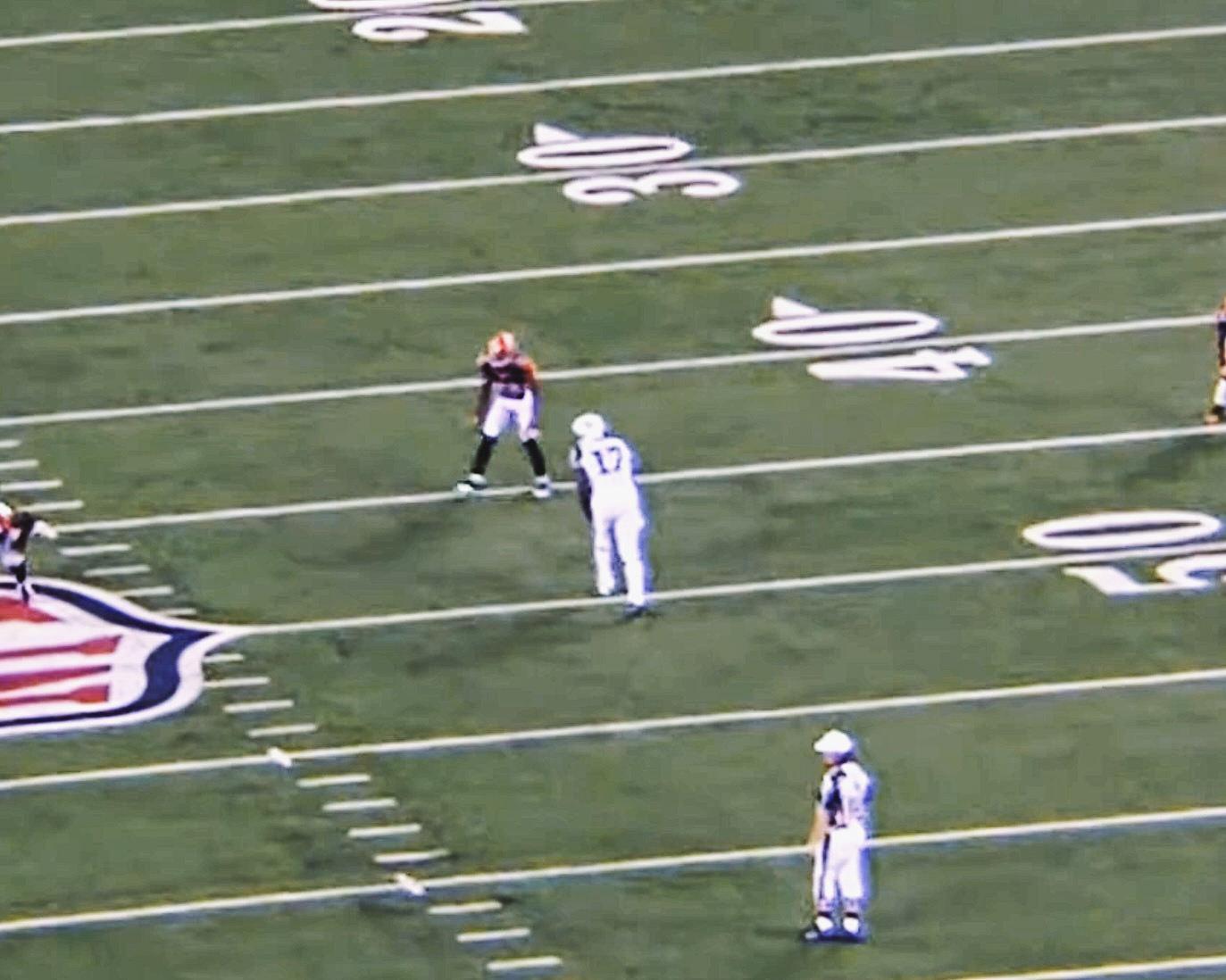
Burress (17) with the Jets in 2011

Burress agreed to a one-year contract worth approximately $3.017 million guaranteed with the New York Jets on July 31, 2011, after turning down a two-year deal from the Pittsburgh Steelers that was rumored to be valued at a little more than the Jets offer but without as much guaranteed money. In his first game back in New York at MetLife Stadium in a pre-season matchup against the Cincinnati Bengals, Burress caught a pass from Mark Sanchez on the first play of the Jets' first drive, and in the second quarter caught a touchdown pass. On October 23, 2011, in a game against the San Diego Chargers, Burress caught three touchdown passes from Sanchez, tying a game career high.

=== Second stint with the Pittsburgh Steelers ===
Burress re-signed with the Steelers on November 20, 2012, after injuries sustained by Jerricho Cotchery and Antonio Brown. On December 30, 2012, Burress caught a 12-yard touchdown pass from quarterback Ben Roethlisberger. Burress had not caught a touchdown from Roethlisberger since 2004. On March 12, 2013, Burress signed a one-year deal to stay with the Steelers. He suffered a torn rotator cuff during a practice on August 8; on August 13, Burress was placed on the injured reserve list by the Steelers.

== NFL career statistics ==
Legend
**Bold**	Career high

=== Regular season ===
Year	Team	GP	Rec	Yds	Avg	Lng	TD	FD	Fum	Lost
2000	PIT	12	22	273	12.4	39	0	13	1	**1**
2001	PIT	16	66	1,008	15.3	43	6	48	1	0
2002	PIT	16	**78**	**1,325**	17.0	62	7	**64**	**2**	**1**
2003	PIT	16	60	860	14.3	47	4	39	1	0
2004	PIT	11	35	698	**19.9**	48	5	30	1	0
2005	NYG	16	76	1,214	16.0	**78**	7	48	1	**1**
2006	NYG	15	63	988	15.7	55	10	43	**2**	**1**
2007	NYG	16	70	1,025	14.6	60	**12**	50	0	0
2008	NYG	10	35	454	13.0	33	4	24	0	0
2011	NYJ	16	45	612	13.6	30	8	38	0	0
2012	PIT	4	3	42	14.0	18	1	3	0	0
2013	PIT	0	0	Did not play due to injury						
Career		148	553	8,499	15.4	78	64	400	9	4

=== Postseason ===
Year	Team	GP	Rec	Yds	Avg	Lng	TD	FD	Fum	Lost
2001	PIT	2	10	151	15.1	32	1	10	0	0
2002	PIT	2	8	162	**20.3**	**40**	1	8	0	0
2004	PIT	2	5	65	13.0	17	1	5	0	0
2005	NYG	1	0	0	0.0	0	0	0	0	0
2006	NYG	1	5	89	17.8	29	**2**	4	0	0
2007	NYG	4	**18**	**221**	12.3	32	1	**13**	**1**	0
Career		12	46	688	15.0	40	6	40	1	0

== Coaching career ==
On July 22, 2017, Burress was hired by the Arizona Cardinals as a coaching intern.

== Legal troubles ==
In August and September 2008, Totowa police responded to two domestic disturbance calls at the Burress residence. At both times temporary restraining orders were issued that were later dismissed by the New Jersey state court.

=== Accidental shooting ===
On November 28, 2008, Burress suffered an accidental, self-inflicted gunshot wound to his right thigh at the nightclub LQ on Lexington Avenue in New York City when his Glock pistol in the pocket of his jeans began sliding down his leg; apparently in reaching for his gun, he inadvertently pulled the trigger, causing the gun to fire. The injury was not life-threatening and Burress was released from an area hospital the next afternoon. Two days later, Burress turned himself in to police to face charges of criminal possession of a handgun. It was later discovered that New York City police only learned about the incident after seeing it on television and were not called by NewYork–Presbyterian Hospital as required by law. New York Mayor Michael Bloomberg called the hospital actions an "outrage" and stated that they are a "chargeable offense". Bloomberg also urged that Burress be prosecuted to the fullest extent of the law, saying that any punishment short of the minimum 3 1/2 years for unlawful carrying of a handgun would be "a mockery of the law." Burress had an expired concealed carry license from Florida, but no New York license.

On December 2, 2008, Burress posted bail of $100,000. Later in the day, Burress reported to Giants Stadium as per team policy for injured but active players and was told he would be suspended without pay for the remaining four games of the 2008 regular season for conduct detrimental to the team. In addition, the Giants placed Burress on their reserve/non-football injury list, meaning he was ineligible to return for the playoffs. Burress was also scheduled to receive $1 million from his signing bonus on December 10, 2008, initially withheld by the team. The NFL Players Association filed a grievance, saying the team violated the collective bargaining agreement and challenging the suspension and fine received by Burress. A Special Master in arbitration subsequently ruled that the Giants must deliver the entire $1 million to Burress, as per the collective bargaining agreement. "To think that a player could carry a loaded gun into a nightclub, shoot himself and miss the rest of the season but get to keep his entire signing bonus illustrates one of the serious flaws in the current system," said Giants co-owner John Mara in a statement afterward.

On December 23, 2008, a search of Burress's New Jersey home by the Totowa, New Jersey police, the New York Police Department, and investigators from the Manhattan District Attorney turned up a 9 mm handgun, a rifle, ammunition, and the clothing believed to have been worn by Burress on the night of his shooting. On June 12, 2009, Burress's attorney Benjamin Brafman announced that he had been unable to reach a sentencing agreement.

Burress asked a Manhattan grand jury for sympathy during two hours of testimony on July 29, 2009. On Monday, August 3, 2009, prosecutors announced that Burress had been indicted by the grand jury on two felony counts of criminal possession of a weapon in the second degree, and a single count of reckless endangerment in the second degree, a misdemeanor.

On August 20, 2009, Burress accepted a plea deal that would put him in prison for two years with an additional two years of supervised release. His sentencing was held on September 22, 2009. Burress hired a prison consultant to advise him on what to expect while in prison. In January 2010, Burress applied for and was denied a work release from prison. On June 6, 2011, Burress was released from a protective custody unit of the Oneida Correctional Facility in Rome, New York, having served 20 months.

=== Civil lawsuits ===
Burress had a civil lawsuit, filed on December 8, 2008, in Broward County, Florida, in which Alise Smith claimed that Burress's $140,000 Mercedes-Benz collided with the back of her car. The suit claimed that Burress was liable for causing permanent injuries to Smith. Burress's car insurance policy had been cancelled three days before the accident due to nonpayment of the premium. In 2012, he was ordered to pay Smith $159,000, which he eventually did by May 2013 after a judge had ordered the sale of his mansion in Virginia Beach.

In January 2010, Burress was the defendant in a civil lawsuit brought against him by a Lebanon County, Pennsylvania car dealer, who claimed that Burress was given a leased Chevrolet Avalanche in return for promises to appear at publicity events for the dealership. The dealer claimed that Burress never returned the car and never attended any publicity events; the damaged car was eventually returned after being impounded by the New York Police Department. Burress acknowledged that he was responsible for some of the damage to the car, but asked a jury to determine the amount. On January 15, 2009, the jury returned a verdict awarding only $1,700 to the dealer, who had asked for damages of up to $19,000. According to the Associated Press, Burress has been sued at least nine times since he joined the NFL in 2000.

=== Tax indictment ===
On April 30, 2015, Burress was indicted by the State of New Jersey on charges that he failed to pay nearly $48,000 in income taxes. Burress filed his 2013 state income tax return on October 20, 2014, for which he submitted an electronic transfer. According to the State Division of Taxation, the transfer failed to go through. Burress was notified multiple times in an attempt to collect the tax debt, including via certified mail, but never responded. The indictment made him the first person in New Jersey to be charged under a new state law which treats bad electronic money transfers as a criminal offense, equivalent to writing bad checks.

On December 7, 2015, Burress pleaded guilty in Mercer County Superior Court to failing to pay $46,000 in taxes on his 2013 income. On February 5, 2016, he was sentenced to five years of probation and ordered to pay $56,000 in back taxes, penalties and restitution. The sentence included a conditional 364-day jail term that could be imposed if he failed to comply with the payment requirements.

== Other ventures ==
Burress, co-wrote the book Giant: The Road to the Super Bowl (ISBN 978-0-06-169574-2), published July 1, 2008 by It Books, about his Super Bowl experience.

Burress appeared on Celebrity Wife Swap on July 29, 2014. Burress joined SportsNet, New York's SportsNite, making his debut as an NFL analyst on Sunday September 7, 2014.
