= Andrew Salvodon =

American track and field athlete

Personal information
- Nationality: American
- Education: Bayside High School

Achievements and titles
- Personal bests: 500 m: 1:00.49i (Virginia Beach 2025); 400 m: 45.84i (Boston 2025); 200 m: 21.87i (Virginia Beach 2025)

Andrew Salvodon is an American track and field athlete who holds the U.S. high school national record in the 500 meters.

== Career ==
On January 17, 2025, competing for Bayside High School at the Virginia Showcase, Salvodon set a new United States high school record in the short track 500 meters, with a time of 1:00.49, breaking Will Sumner's previous record of 1:01.25 set in 2022 by 0.76 seconds. Finishing second to Salvodon was Quincy Wilson, who ran a time of 1:02.49.

On March 15, 2025, Salvodon set an indoor 400 metres personal record of 45.84 at the New Balance Nationals Indoor championship, finishing second to Quincy Wilson. Salvodon and Quincy were the second and third high school athletes to go under 46 seconds indoors ever, and Salvodon is the second fastest in history. Salvodon also won a national title at the Adidas Track Nationals in the 400 metres that same season.

Salvodon currently runs for the University of South Carolina.
