= Landstown High School =

Coordinates: 36°46′46.4″N 76°6′3.2″W

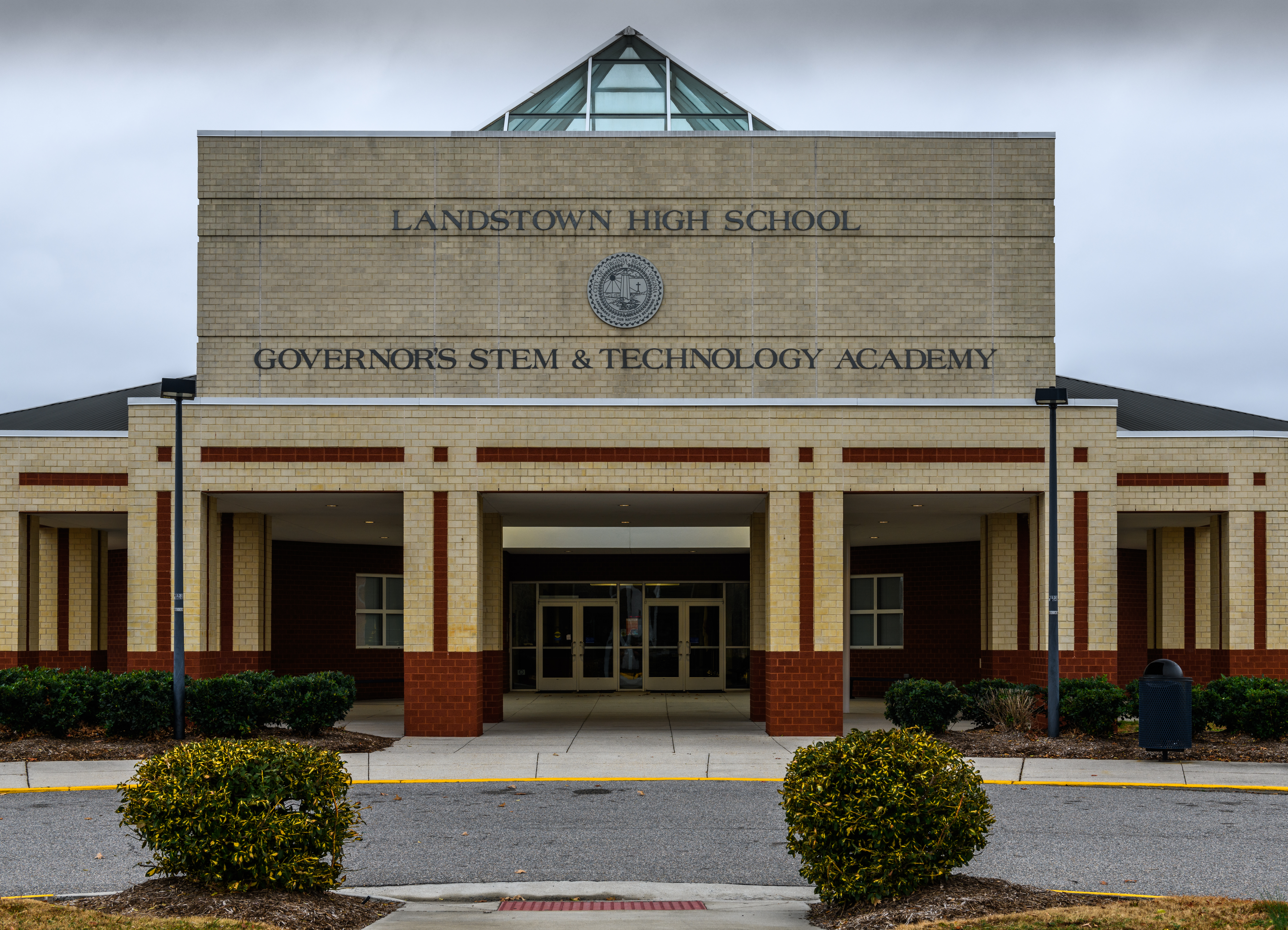
- Landstown High School Main Entrance

Location
- 2001 Concert Drive; Virginia Beach, Virginia 23456; United States

Information
- School type: Public, high school
- Founded: 2001
- Locale: City, Large
- School district: Virginia Beach City Public Schools
- NCES District ID: 5103840
- Superintendent: Dr. Donald Robertson
- NCES School ID: 510384002323
- Principal: Paula Johnson
- Teaching staff: 126.40 (on an FTE basis)
- Grades: 9–12
- Enrollment: 2,152 (2024–25)
- Student to teacher ratio: 17.03
- Language: English
- Colors: Black, Royal Blue, Silver, and White
- Athletics conference: Virginia High School League; Beach District; Class 6 Region A
- Mascot: Eagle
- Rival: Floyd E. Kellam High School
- Feeder schools: Corporate Landing Middle School, Landstown Middle School
- Website: Official site

Landstown High School Governor's STEM and Technology Academy is a public secondary school located in Virginia Beach, Virginia which first opened in 2001.

The school features the Technology Academy and Governor's STEM Academy, two of several magnet programs in Virginia Beach. It was founded as a general high school and technology magnet school in 2001 and additionally designated a Governor's STEM Academy during the 2012–2013 school year.

Landstown is home to the award-winning "Eagle Elite" Madrigal (Chamber) Choir. Under the former direction of Dr. Martha Springstead, the choral department has performed in NYC (2005) with the Heritage Festivals of Gold at Riverside Church, and are members of the Disney Honors, Class of 2006, Class of 2011, and Class of 2015 held at Disney World.

== Technology & Governor's STEM Academy ==
- Technology Academy

The Technology Academy at Landstown High School opened as one of several magnet programs in the school district in September 2001. It features a curriculum designed for students with a deep interest in and talent for technology.

- Governor's STEM Academy

The Governor's STEM Academy for Engineering, Marketing, and Information Technology was unanimously approved by the Virginia State Board of Education for implementation in the 2012–2013 school year at Landstown High School. This Academy provides 4-year plans of study for students in the fields of science, technology, engineering, and mathematics (STEM).

== Alma Mater & Fight Song ==
- Alma Mater

In our hearts, we will soar like eagles, In our lives, there will be friendships true. When we raise the banner of Landstown High, We will cheer black, silver, and blue. Lift us high with commitment to greatness. Our success is the service we do. In a class, on the field, eagle spirits are sealed When we cheer black, silver, and blue. In our hearts, we will soar like eagles. In our lives, there will be friendships true. When we raise the banner of Landstown High, We will cheer black, silver, and blue. Fair Landstown, we honor you!

- Fight Song

Fight, Eagles, Fight to victory! Blue, black, and white, Go Eagles! Show the rest that we're the best And fight on for your name! FIGHT! FIGHT! FIGHT! Fly, Eagles, fly soar with pride! Here, stand in unity! We pledge our hearts and honor To our Landstown Eagles Pride! GO EAGLES!

== Athletic honors ==
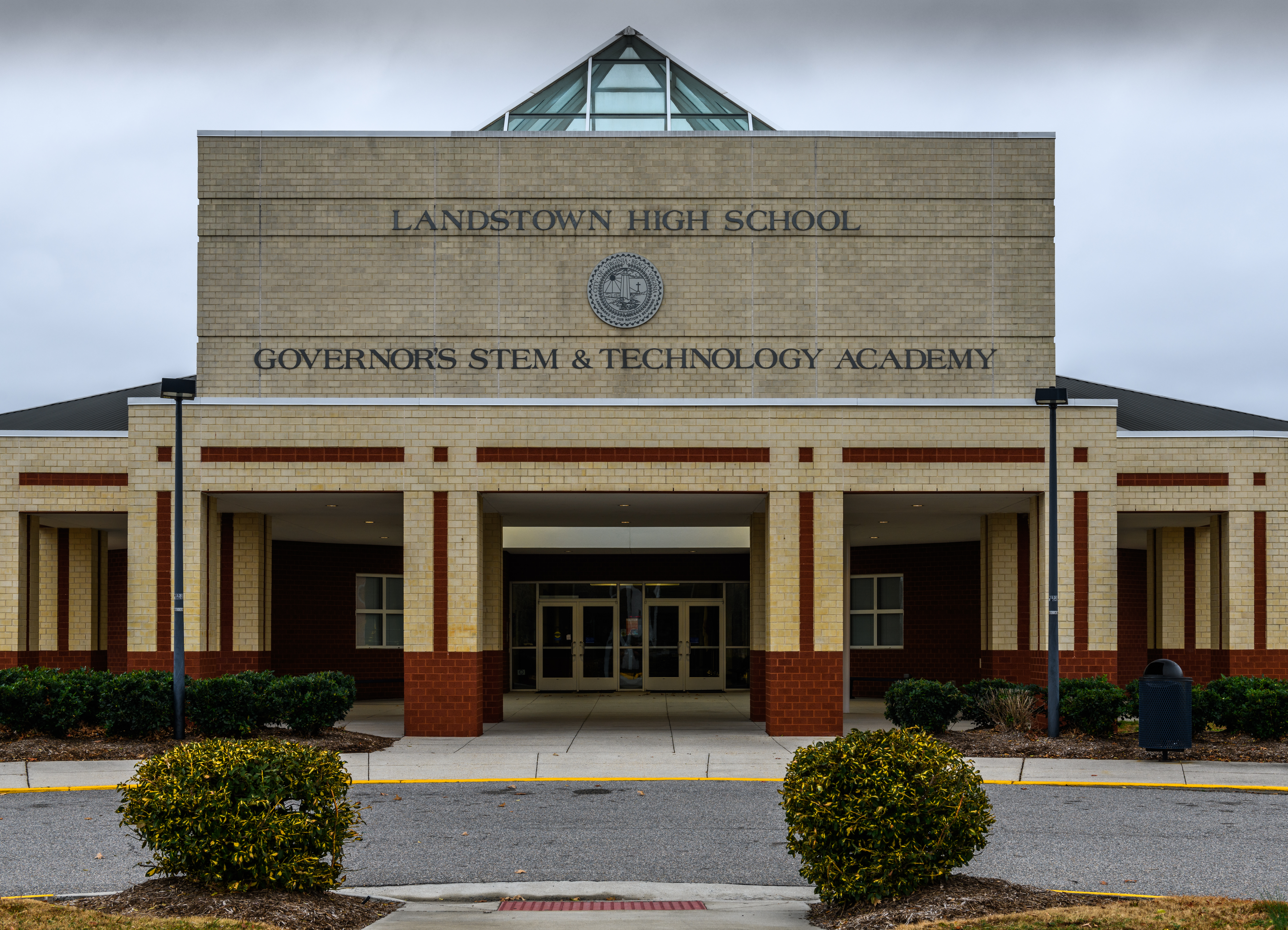
Main entrance to Landstown High School

Landstown's football team went to three consecutive state championship games between 2003 and 2005 under Coach Chris Beatty, who led the team to a 40–2 record during that three-year span. They won the state championship in 2004 but lost in 2003 and 2005. The star players during this time were Percy Harvin, Deveon Simmons, and Damon McDaniel. In early 2006, Coach Beatty left Landstown to become the offensive coordinator at Hampton University in Hampton, Virginia followed by a stint at Northern Illinois University. As of 2025, he is the wide receivers coach for the Las Vegas Raiders.

Harvin set five state track records while he was at Landstown High, winning five gold medals at the state finals in 2005: long jump, triple jump, 100 meters, 200 meters and 400-meter relay.

- 2005 State championship winner, Boys outdoor track team.
- 2006 Regional championship winner, Boys soccer team.
- 2006 State championship winner, Girls track team.
- 2008 Nike Indoor Nationals National title in the 4 × 200 meter relay, Girls indoor track team, running a US #1 time of 1:40:08. All-American honors awarded to relay members Kelnesha Hinnant, Olivia Hutchins, Cierra McGee and Marlena Wesh. Wesh also won the 200 meter dash National title with a time of 24.46. Wesh competed in the 2012 Summer Olympics for Haiti.
- 2008 annual Penn Relays Carnival, Girls outdoor track, placing 4th in the 4 × 100 meter relay, with a time of 46.07, the fastest American time. Relay team members Olivia Hutchins, Leah Brown, Cierra McGee, and Marlena Wesh were awarded gold watches and advanced to the Championship of America.
- 2008 state championship winner, Girls indoor track team. They were the first team in the history of Virginia track and field to win all three relay titles: the 4 × 800 meter relay, the 4 × 100 meter relay, & the 4 × 400 meter relay. They also tied the record for the most points ever scored at the VHSL AAA state track and field meet with a score of 94 points. Eagles members were awarded All-State honors.
- Javonte Culbreath is awarded Beach District Honorable Mention for the 2011–2012 varsity basketball season.
- 2015 State semifinalist, Girls Soccer. In their first ever trip to the State Tournament, the Lady Eagles ended their season 17–3–2, the three losses came in the post-season tournaments and were by a goal. The team outscored their opponents 65-to-9 overall and recorded 17 overall shutouts (not all were wins). They were the Coastal Conference 1 regular season champions (winning all six of their games), the conference's tournament runner-up (lost 1–0 to Cox in overtime), and the South Region tournament's runner-up (lost 1–0 to Cox). In the State semifinals, they ended up losing 2–1 to defending State champion, Battlefield.
- 2019 State champion, Boys Basketball.

== Notable alumni ==
- Mychal Denzel Smith (2004) – author
- Stanley Pringle (2005) - basketball player who plays professionally in the Philippines
- Percy Harvin (2006) – offensive player for the National Football League
- Karen Estrella (2007) – rhythm guitarist for emo band, Padfoot
- Marlena Wesh (2009) – sprinter for Haiti in the 2012 Summer Olympics
- Travis Brent (2010) – defensive player for the United Soccer League
- Darrell Wesh (2010) – sprinter for Haiti in the 2016 Summer Olympics
- Garrett Halfhill (2011) – defensive player for the United Soccer League

== See also ==
- AAA Eastern Region
- AAA Beach District
