= Green Run, Pleasants County, West Virginia =

Green Run
- Unincorporated community
- Location within the state of West Virginia Green Run (the United States)
- Coordinates: 39°22′51″N 81°13′17″W
- Country: United States
- State: West Virginia
- County: Pleasants
- Elevation: 699 ft (213 m)
- Time zone: UTC-5 (Eastern (EST))
  - Summer (DST): UTC-4 (EDT)
- GNIS ID: 1554603

Green Run is an unincorporated community in Pleasants County, West Virginia, United States.
