= Beach District =

The Beach District is a district of the Virginia High School League. The schools in the Beach District compete in the 6A and 5A divisions.

== Facts about the District ==
As its name implies, the Beach District is composed solely of all 11 public high schools in Virginia Beach. It is also the largest district in terms of membership in the Virginia High School League. As a result in some sports, there are no non-district games, in particular for football, where there are only 10 games in the regular season.

== Member schools ==
- Bayside High School of Virginia Beach, Virginia
- First Colonial High School of Virginia Beach, Virginia
- Frank W. Cox High School of Virginia Beach, Virginia
- Floyd Kellam High School of Virginia Beach, Virginia
- Green Run High School of Virginia Beach, Virginia
- Kempsville High School of Virginia Beach, Virginia
- Landstown High School of Virginia Beach, Virginia
- Ocean Lakes High School of Virginia Beach, Virginia
- Princess Anne High School of Virginia Beach, Virginia
- Salem High School of Virginia Beach, Virginia
- Tallwood High School of Virginia Beach, Virginia
