= Green Run High School =

High school in Virginia, United States

Location
- 1700 Dahlia Drive; Virginia Beach, Virginia 23453; United States; 36.804639°N 76.111361°W

Information
- School type: Public, high school
- Motto: Esse Quam Videri (To be rather than to seem.)
- Founded: September 1979
- Locale: City, Large
- School district: Virginia Beach City Public Schools
- NCES District ID: 5103840
- Superintendent: Donald E. Robertson
- NCES School ID: 510384001879
- Principal: Tennille Bowser
- Staff: 164
- Teaching staff: 92.80 (on an FTE basis)
- Grades: 9–12
- Enrollment: 1,465 (2024–25)
- Student to teacher ratio: 15.79
- Language: English
- Colors: Royal blue, Kelly green and white
- Athletics conference: Virginia High School League; Beach District; Eastern Region
- Mascot: Stallions
- Rival: Kempsville High School Bayside High School
- Feeder schools: Plaza Middle School Independence Middle School Bayside Middle School
- Website: greenrunhs.vbschools.com

Green Run High School is a public secondary school located at 1700 Dahlia Drive of the Green Run area of Virginia Beach, Virginia. Green Run hosts a very diverse student population many of which come from the large concentration of military families that have moved into the area within the past couple of decades. The school was the largest high school in Virginia when it opened in 1979, with 247,000 feet of space. When it was first opened, it had the largest enrollment in the state. Due to changing demographics and the ensuing addition of new schools, the school is now one of the smallest in Virginia Beach when it comes to student body population. Construction cost totaled $11.4 million. The current head principal of the school is Tennille Bowser.

In April 2010, it was announced that Green Run High School was one of three high schools nationwide to be awarded the 2010 College Board Inspiration Award winners for improving their academic environments and helping under-served students achieve equitable access to higher education. The prize includes a $25,000 award presented by The College Board.

In 2016, Green Run's high school NJROTC chapter won second place in the National High School NJROTC SOP & Drill Competition, and in 2017, Green Run's NJROTC won first place of all the high schools in the competition.

In 2019, Health and Physical Education Teacher, Bridgette Berthold, was a recipient of the Virginia Lottery’s “Made in Virginia” award. As a winner, she allocated a $9,000 reward to Green Run High School, allowing them to collect another $5,000 from the Virginia Lottery and $4,000 worth of school supplies from The Supply Room.

== History ==
Green Run High School was opened in 1979 and is one of three Virginia Beach schools that can be traced back to the Algonquin settlements. The land was previously used for fox hunting by the Princess Anne Hunt Club, as a garden for the Norfolk City jail, and was owned later by a Mennonite Farming family until it was sold in the 1960s.

On July 13, 2012, President Obama visited Green Run as part of his presidential campaign.

In September 2013, Green Run Collegiate High School was established as a charter school with an International Baccalaureate program. Green Run Collegiate shares space with Green Run High School.

== Notable alumni ==
- Shomi Patwary (Class of '00), Music Video Director
- Plaxico Burress (Class of '96), NFL wide receiver.
- Sean Siler (Class of '88), Microsoft employee who starred in the "I'm a PC" advertising campaign (2008–2009)
- Ron Villanueva (Class of '88), first Filipino-American and youngest member having ever been elected to Virginia Beach City Council ('02 - Pres).
- Andre Cason (Class of '87), former sprinter and 2 time World Championship Gold Medalist ('91 & '93) in the 4 x 100 m relay and silver medalist in the 100 meters.
- Keith Goganious (Class of '87), NFL linebacker
- Matt Darby (Class of '87), NFL defensive back
- Al Chamblee (Class of '87), NFL linebacker

== See also ==
- AAA Eastern Region
- AAA Beach District

== Sports achievements ==
- In 2021-2022 The Green Run Varsity Football team won the AAA Beach District
- In 2022-2023 The Green Run Varsity Football team won the AAA Beach District
- In 2020-2021 The Green Run Varsity Basketball team won the Virginia State Championship
- In 2024-2025 The Green Run Varsity Basketball team won the Virginia State Championship
