= Bayside High School (Virginia) =

Location
- 4960 Haygood Road; Virginia Beach, Virginia 23455; United States; 36°52′11″N 76°9′3″W

Information
- Type: Public High School
- Motto: To prepare today's youth for tomorrow's world
- Founded: 1964
- Locale: City, Large
- School district: Virginia Beach City Public Schools
- NCES District ID: 5103840
- Superintendent: Donald E. Robertson
- NCES School ID: 510384001675
- Principal: Troy A. Walton
- Staff: 116.14 (FTE)
- Teaching staff: 117.00 (on an FTE basis)
- Grades: 9–12
- Enrollment: 1,984 (2024–25)
- Student to teacher ratio: 16.96
- Colors: Scarlet and Gold
- Athletics conference: Virginia High School League, Beach District, Eastern Region
- Nickname: Marlins
- Rival: Princess Anne High School
- Communities served: Aragona, Amherst, Bayside Arms, Campus East, Carriage House, Cypress Point, Diamond Springs, Lake Edwards, Lynbrook Landing, Newpointe, Northridge, Weblin, Witchduck Landing,
- Feeder schools: Bayside Middle School, Independence Middle School
- Website: baysidehs.vbschools.com

Bayside High School is a public high school located in Virginia Beach, Virginia. It is in Virginia Beach City Public Schools, and serves 1,990 students as of 2023–24.

The school is one of several magnet programs in Virginia Beach, known for its Health Sciences Academy.

Bayside is in the top three in Standards of Learning scores within the school district.

== History ==
Bayside High School opened in September 1964 as the fourth high school in Virginia Beach City Public Schools. The Virginia Beach School Board had approved the creation of the school in February 1963. Norman W. Morris served as the school's first principal. Bayside initially served students in grades eight through 12, and its first graduating class held its commencement ceremony in the school's football stadium in 1967.

Bayside celebrated its 50th anniversary during the 2014–15 school year. The Virginia General Assembly passed a joint resolution commemorating the anniversary, noting that by that time Bayside students had won more than 61 district, 23 regional and 16 state championship titles in athletics and other extracurricular competitions.

== Health Sciences Academy ==
The Health Sciences Academy, established at Bayside in 2002, is a citywide academy program operated by Virginia Beach City Public Schools and is open to eligible students throughout Virginia Beach. The program provides a college-preparatory curriculum focused on medical and health sciences. Students study subjects including anatomy, physiology and pathophysiology and may take medical-science electives such as forensic medicine, medical microbiology and hereditary medicine.

Academy students may pursue coursework related to medicine and veterinary medicine, nursing and other allied health fields. The program also provides opportunities for clinical experiences and requires students to complete at least 150 hours of community service during their four years in the academy, including at least 75 hours related to medicine.

== Athletics ==
Bayside has won state championships in several sports. The baseball team won the Virginia state championship in 1976, defeating Mount Vernon 3–0 in the championship game. The softball team won the state championship in 1978 with a 7–5 victory over Stafford.

The boys' indoor track and field team won a state championship in 1978. At the championship meet, Bayside's Dan Krueger set a state-meet record in the shot put with a throw of 65 feet 5 1/2 inches. The boys' outdoor track and field team won the Group AAA state championship in 2006, led by Charles Clark, who won the 100-, 200- and 400-meter events.

The boys' basketball team won consecutive Virginia Group AAA state championships in 1990 and 1991. Mario Mullen, who helped lead Bayside to the 1991 championship, was named the Group AAA state player of the year that season.

In football, Bayside won the Beach District and Division 6 Eastern Region championships in 1992.

In January 2025, Bayside senior Andrew Salvodon set a United States high school indoor record in the 500 meters, running 1:00.49 at the Virginia Showcase in Virginia Beach. Later that year, Salvodon won the Virginia Class 5 outdoor championship in the 400 meters, and Bayside won the boys' 4 × 100-meter relay.

== Notable alumni ==
- Kenneth S. Reightler, Jr. (1969) – NASA astronaut
- Derrick Gardner (1983) – jazz trumpeter
- Charles Clark (2006) – sprinter
- EJ Manuel (2008) – Florida State and Buffalo Bills quarterback
- Taquan Mizzell (2013) – Chicago Bears wide receiver
- Quin Blanding (2014) – Carolina Panthers safety
- Andrew Salvodon (2025) – track and field athlete
