= Floyd E. Kellam High School =

Location
- 2665 West Neck Road; Virginia Beach, VA 23456; United States; 36°44′35″N 76°03′46″W

Information
- School type: Public, high school
- Founded: 1962
- Locale: City, Large
- School district: Virginia Beach City Public Schools
- NCES District ID: 5103840
- Superintendent: Dr. Donald Robertson
- NCES School ID: 510384001685
- Principal: Leah Nelson
- Staff: 136
- Teaching staff: 102.39 (on an FTE basis)
- Grades: 9–12
- Enrollment: 1,842 (2024–25)
- Student to teacher ratio: 17.99
- Language: English
- Campus: "The Castle"
- Colors: Black, Gold, and White
- Athletics conference: Virginia High School League; Beach District; Eastern Region
- Mascot: Knights
- Communities served: Pungo, Princess Anne, Sandbridge
- Feeder schools: Princess Anne Middle School Landstown Middle School
- Website: Official site

Floyd E. Kellam High School is a public high school in Virginia Beach, Virginia. Located in the city's southern section, in Princess Anne, the school first opened in 1962, named after Judge Floyd Eaton Kellam. Kellam High School serves a large portion of the city of Virginia Beach, with the attendance boundary extending south to the North Carolina border. Kellam High moved into a new facility in 2014.

Floyd Kellam High School is fully accredited under Virginia's Standards of Learning program. The school is the third-oldest in Virginia Beach, next to Princess Anne High School and Frank W. Cox High School. Kellam has also been a blue ribbon school in the Fine Arts Department for the years 2006 and 2007.

== Sports ==
Virginia State Championships:

- 1994 – Gymnastics
- 2006 – Gymnastics
- 2010 – Gymnastics
- 2013 – Gymnastics
- 2016 – Gymnastics
- 2024 – Boys Volleyball

== Demographics and population ==
In 2020, Floyd E. Kellam had 1,947 total students, slightly down the previous years 1,957 students.

2020 enrollment by grade:

- Grade 9 – 507
- Grade 10 – 480
- Grade 11 – 459
- Grade 12 – 507

2020 racial and ethic demographics:

- Asian – 3.3%
- Black – 4.6%
- Hispanic – 8.2%
- Multiple Races – 6.2%
- Native American – 0.2%
- Native Hawaiian – 0.4%
- White – 77.1%

== Notable alumni ==
- 1970 – Carl Summerell, New York Giants
- 1971 – Herbert Scott, Dallas Cowboys
- 1989 – Matt Williams, Milwaukee Brewers
- 2002 – Ryan Zimmerman, Washington Nationals
- 2005 – Jamelle Bouie, New York Times columnist
- 2006 – Ian Thomas, Atlanta Braves
- 2024 – Kemari Copeland, Virginia Tech Football

== See also ==
- AAA Eastern Region
- AAA Beach District
