= Virginia Beach City Public Schools =

School district in Virginia, United States

Address
- 2512 George Mason Drive Virginia Beach, Virginia, 23456; United States

District information
- Type: Public
- Motto: Charting the Course
- Grades: PreK–12
- Superintendent: Dr. Donald Robertson
- Schools: 87
- NCES District ID: 5103840

Students and staff
- Students: 64,731 (2024–2025)
- Teachers: 4,519.33 (on an FTE basis)
- Staff: 6,875.75 (on an FTE basis)
- Student–teacher ratio: 14.32

Other information
- Website: www.vbschools.com

Virginia Beach City Public Schools is the branch of the government of the city of Virginia Beach, Virginia responsible for public K-12 education. Like all public school systems in the state, it is legally classified as a school division instead of a school district. Although Virginia school divisions perform the functions of school districts in other U.S. states, they have no taxing authority, instead relying on appropriations from their local governments.

The school system is the fourth largest in Virginia, and among the 50 largest school systems in the United States (based on student enrollment). All of the division's 80+ schools are fully accredited in the Virginia Standards of Learning (SOL).

Virginia Beach City Public Schools currently serves approximately 70,000 students, and includes 87 schools.

The division has a fleet of nearly eight hundred school buses, which is serviced by two bus garages and is the second largest employer in the city, following Naval Air Station Oceana.

== History ==
In 2004 the school board made plans to change the snack offerings and to establish a physical education class for 8th graders as a result of higher than desired obesity rates.

In 2004 there were plans to make significant changes to district attendance boundaries.

== List of schools ==
=== Elementary schools ===
- Alanton Elementary School
- Arrowhead Elementary School
- Bayside Elementary School
- Birdneck Elementary
- Brookwood Elementary School
- Centerville Elementary School
- Christopher Farms Elementary School
- Cooke Elementary
- College Park Elementary School
- Corporate Landing Elementary School
- Creeds Elementary School
- John B. Dey Elementary School
- Diamond Springs Elementary School
- Fairfield Elementary School
- Glenwood Elementary
- Green Run Elementary School
- Hermitage Elementary School
- Holland Elementary School
- Indian Lakes Elementary School
- Kempsville Elementary School
- Kempsville Meadows Elementary School
- King's Grant Elementary School
- Kingston Elementary School
- Landstown Elementary School
- Linkhorn Park Elementary School
- Luxford Elementary School
- Lynnhaven Elementary School
- Malibu Elementary School
- New Castle Elementary School
- Newtown Elementary School
- North Landing Elementary School
- Ocean Lakes Elementary School
- Old Donation School (for students identified as gifted)
- Parkway Elementary School
- Pembroke Elementary School
- Pembroke Meadows Elementary School
- Point O View Elementary School
- Princess Anne Elementary School
- Providence Elementary School
- Red Mill Elementary School
- Rosemont Elementary School
- Rosemont Forest Elementary School
- Salem Elementary School
- Seatack Elementary School
- Shelton Park Elementary School
- Strawbridge Elementary School
- Tallwood Elementary School
- Thalia Elementary School
- Throughgood Elementary School
- Trantwood Elementary School
- Three Oaks Elementary School
- White Oaks Elementary School
- Bettie F. Williams Elementary School
- Windsor Oaks Elementary School
- Windsor Woods Elementary School
- Woodstock Elementary School
- W. T. Cooke Elementary School

=== Middle schools ===
- Bayside Middle School
- Bayside 6th Grade Campus
- Brandon Middle School
- CEL (Center for Effective Learning)
- Corporate Landing Middle School
- Great Neck Middle School
- Independence Middle School
- Edward E. Brickell Academy at Old Donation School
- Kempsville Middle School
- Landstown Middle School
- Larkspur Middle School
- Lynnhaven Middle School
- Plaza Middle School
- Princess Anne Middle School
- Renaissance Academy Middle
- Salem Middle School
- Virginia Beach Middle School

=== High schools ===
- Bayside High School
- Frank W. Cox High School
- First Colonial High School
- Green Run High School
- Floyd E. Kellam High School
- Kempsville High School
- Landstown High School
- Ocean Lakes High School
- Princess Anne High School
- Renaissance Academy
- Salem High School
- Tallwood High School

== Academy programs ==
Many of the district's high schools along with Plaza Middle School feature special academy programs as well as their regular zoned classes. Rising students require acceptance into the academies in order to attend. The academies are:

- Mathematics and Science Academy at Ocean Lakes High School
- International Baccalaureate Academy at Princess Anne High School
- International Baccalaureate Academy Middle Years Programme at Plaza Middle School
- Entrepreneurship and Business Academy at Kempsville High School
- Legal Studies Academy at First Colonial High School
- Global Studies and World Languages Academy at Tallwood High School
- Governor's STEM and Technology Academy at Landstown High School
- Health Sciences Academy at Bayside High School
- Visual and Performing Arts Academy at Salem High School
- Environmental Studies Program at the Brock Environmental Center
- Green Run Collegiate
- Advanced Technology Center
- Technical & Career Education Center
- Old Donation School
- An Achievable Dream Academy

== Former or repurposed school buildings ==
- Kemps Landing School, 525 Kempsville Road, has been remodeled into a residential apartment building.
- Plaza Elementary School - Opened in 1961, closed in 2009
