= Justin Anderson (running back) =

American football player (born 1986)

Personal information
- Born: July 4, 1986 (age 40); Chicago, Illinois
- Listed height: 5 ft 11 in (1.80 m)
- Listed weight: 222 lb (101 kg)

Career information
- High school: Steinmetz (Chicago, Illinois)
- College: Northern Illinois Huskies (2006–2009)

Awards and highlights
- Second-team All-Mid-American Conference (2007)

Justin Anderson (born July 4, 1986) is a former running back for the Northern Illinois Huskies. He was the backup in 2006 for phenom Garrett Wolfe, and in 2007 was the starter for the Huskies. In 2008, he lost many carries to Mico Brown.

== Early life ==
While at Steinmetz High School in Chicago, Anderson was ranked 29th among Illinois prospects, 65th in the nation, and was a three-star recruit by Rivals.com. He entered his final prep season at No. 67 among Midwest Top 100 Players by The Sporting News, and No. 80 among Midwest Hot 100 by Score.com.

He was a four-year regular as option quarterback who produced 4,225 yards of total offense and 58 touchdowns during his career. Among Anderson's high school recognitions were team MVP, first-team Chicago Public League All-Section, and second team Chicago Sun-Times All-Public League as a senior. He rushed for 840 yards (8.7 avg.) and 12 TDs on 97 carries for the Class 8A (the Illinois class with the top 12.5 percent in terms of total school enrollment) playoff qualifier during his senior season. He entered his final campaign as Chicago Sun-Times Top 100 Area Player and Chicago Tribune conference Player to Watch. He was listed No. 18 among Top 30 Junior Prospects by Chicago Sun-Times following selection as team MVP, first team all-section, first team Chicago Sun-Times All-Public League and special mention all-area during junior year.

Anderson totaled 1,541 yards of total offense and 26 TDs, including 1,288 rushing yards (school's first 1,000-yard season) and 18 TDs on 9-2 conference champion and playoff qualifier as junior. He set a school record with a 92-yard rush during his junior season, and also gained 922 rushing yards and nine TDs for his 12-1 team as a sophomore.

== Northern Illinois University ==
=== 2005 season ===
With a logjam at the tailback position, Anderson redshirted his true freshman season.

=== 2006 season ===
In a reserve role behind conference MVP Garrett Wolfe, Anderson performed well, making his collegiate debut versus Ohio State. Against Indiana State, Anderson had six carries for 53 yards, including a 16-yard touchdown run. He then gained 53 yards on 10 rushing attempts at Eastern Michigan. He played in 11 games as a reserve running back, and on special teams. He finished the year with 25 carries for 117 yards and a touchdown.

=== 2007 season ===
2007 was Anderson's coming-out party, as he led the Huskies in every statistical rushing category, and earning second-team all-conference honors. He had 274 carries for 1298 yards and eight scores, averaging 4.5 yards per rush. In the process, Anderson became the 9th running back to rush for 1,000 yards in a season for Northern Illinois. Among the number of great games this season, against Eastern Michigan, Anderson had 213 all-purpose yards and a score. Against Temple, Anderson ran for 163 yards and two touchdowns in the one-point loss. In NIU's win against Idaho, Anderson ran for 167 yards and one touchdown.

=== Career statistics ===
NIU		Rushing					Receiving					Defense
Season	Games	Att	Yds	Avg	Lg	TD	Rec	Yds	Avg	Lg	TD	Solo	Assist	Tackle
2006	11	25	117	4.7	16	1	0	0	0.0	0	0	1	0	1
2007	12	274	1,298	4.5	52	8	45	263	5.8	23	3	1	1	2
2008	13	53	209	3.9	25	2	0	0	0.0	0	0	0	0	0
Total	36	352	1,571	4.4	52	11	45	263	5.8	23	3	2	1	3

== Honors ==
=== 2007 ===
- Named second-team All-Mid-American Conference.
