= Princess Anne High School =

High School in Virginia, US

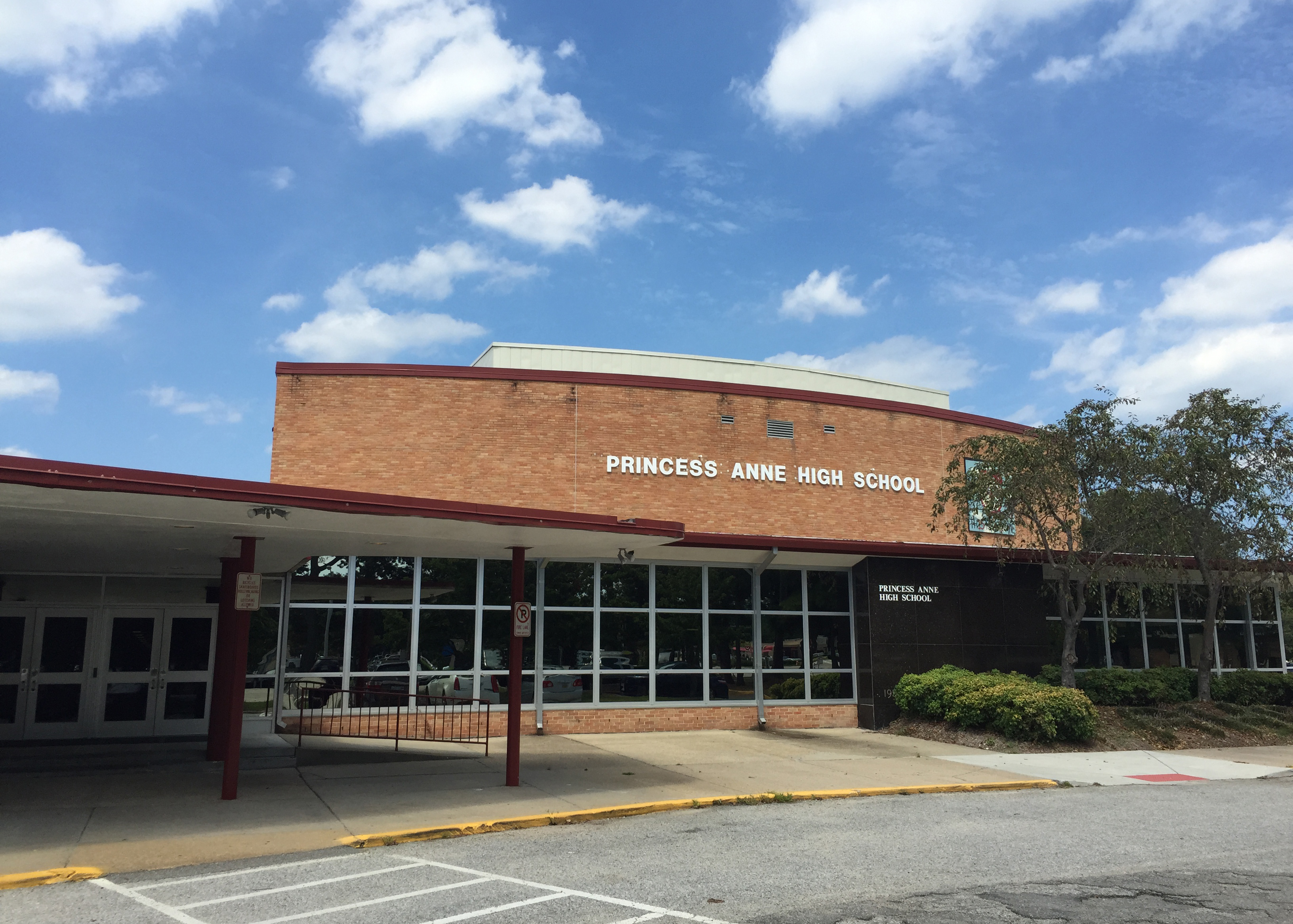

Location
- 4400 Virginia Beach Boulevard; Virginia Beach, Virginia 23452; United States; 36°50′42″N 76°7′40″W

Information
- School type: Public, High School
- Motto: Brick By Brick
- Founded: 1954
- School district: Virginia Beach City Public Schools
- Superintendent: Donald Robertson
- Principal: Ryan Schubart
- Staff: 211
- Teaching staff: 124.63 (FTE)
- Grades: 9-12
- Enrollment: 1,704 (2021-22)
- Student to teacher ratio: 13.68
- Colors: Red, white and blue
- Athletics conference: Virginia High School League; Beach District; Eastern Region
- Mascot: Cavaliers
- Rival: Bayside High School Kellam High School
- Feeder schools: Plaza Middle School, Old Donation School, Independence Middle School
- Website: https://princessannehs.vbschools.com/

Princess Anne High School (PAHS) is one of 11 high schools in the Virginia Beach City Public School System. The school features, as its academy, the International Baccalaureate Programme. Opened in 1954, it is the oldest remaining high school in Virginia Beach, Virginia, United States. The school is named after the now extinct Princess Anne County, Virginia (itself named after the British Royal, Queen Anne, titled at the time and prior to ascension, Princess of Denmark) which was annexed with the founding of Virginia Beach. Princess Anne High School was slated to be demolished following the construction of a replacement building. Demolition and construction of a new building were slated to take place in 2024, but those plans have since been moved to the 2031-32 school year.

== History ==
=== Origins ===
The school was built during a period of rapid expansion of the then Princess Anne County. The cost of construction and equipment was $3,500,000, which included approximately $1,000,000 of federal funds. The school was first occupied in September 1954. Several schools had previously been built and remain in use today, however, they were converted to smaller middle or elementary schools in order to address ballooning class sizes. In 1963, Princess Anne County was incorporated into the newly formed City of Virginia Beach and thus PAHS became the oldest remaining high school in the system.

Princess Anne celebrated its 70th anniversary during the 2023-2024 school year.

Their mascot, the Cavalier, is named after the Virginia Cavaliers, English nobility who received large land grants in eastern Virginia from King James I of England.

=== September 1, 1995 fire ===
Four days before the opening of school in September 1995, a fire destroyed approximately one-third of the building. The blaze began in the library, destroying numerous valuable records, among them the entire collection of PA yearbooks before 1995 and numerous printed and digital course materials collected by teachers throughout their careers. The exact cause of the fire has never been announced.

Throughout both the 1995-1996 school year and the 1996-1997 fall semester, classes were held in a nearby vacant shopping mall known as "Celebration Station", which has since been demolished. Shuttle buses transported students between the temporary location and the remaining, intact portion of the school/portable classrooms on the main campus.

Following the fire, a large portion of the school was entirely rebuilt. As a result, the PA library now maintains one of the most extensive and up-to-date media collections of any Virginia Beach high school. A new wing was also added for art classes and studios. The school reopened in January 1997, with the official re-dedication ceremony held on May 4, 1997.

== Academics ==
The school is part of the Virginia Beach Public School System, which has a reputation of being the best in the Hampton Roads region. Princess Anne maintained its place as the highest ranked high school in Virginia Beach as well as the Hampton Roads region in the Newsweek listing of "America's Best High Schools", continuing to place in the list annually (#451 in 2012, #263 in 2011, #123 in 2010, #167 in 2008 and #213 in 2007). In 2012, The Washington Post released its list for "America's Most Challenging High Schools", and all eleven Virginia Beach City High Schools were in the top 1,900, but Princess Anne held the highest rank by a significant margin at #250. The only Virginia Beach high school International Baccalaureate program is housed in PA, attracting gifted students from throughout Virginia Beach.

The school has excelled in the VHSL academic competitions, with numerous championships in forensics and debate.

On GreatSchools, the school's overall rating is 8/10; college readiness being a 9/10; test scores a 7/10, and equity being a 4/10.

== Special programs ==
In addition to serving regularly zoned students and the International Baccalaureate program, the school hosts the Virginia Beach center for students with moderate to severe disabilities (located within the "West Building") and used to host a citywide center for pregnant teenagers (The "PA Center"), which now is located in the Renaissance Academy. Princess Anne is also one of the few high schools in Virginia Beach with an NJROTC program.

== Athletics ==
Princess Anne has won 27 team VHSL State team sports championships and 19 State individual sports championships. 22 of the team titles have come since 1999. PA students participate in the following sports, in accordance with the Virginia High School League (VHSL):

Fall sports
Girls:	Cheerleading, golf, cross country, field hockey, volleyball
Boys:	Football, golf, cross country, volleyball
Winter sports
Girls:	Basketball, gymnastics, indoor track, swimming and diving
Boys:	Basketball, wrestling, indoor track, swimming and diving
Spring sports
Girls:	Softball, tennis, soccer, track and field
Boys:	Baseball, tennis, soccer, track and field

Princess Anne's baseball team won the VHSL State Championship in 2005.

== Location and district ==
Princess Anne is centrally located within the city of Virginia Beach along Virginia Beach Blvd. The school is adjacent to the downtown Town Center area. The two middle schools that feed into the student body include portions of Independence Middle School and Plaza Middle School. This includes portions of the Thoroughgood, Thalia, Pembroke, Lynnhaven, Princess Anne Plaza and Windsor Woods neighborhoods. Additionally, due to the International Baccalaureate programme, those under the IB Middle Years Programme automatically feed into Princess Anne, assuming they have completed the respective requirements. Also, a nearby gifted elementary and middle school, Old Donation School, tends to feed heavily into its International Baccalaureate programme, though in recent years this has declined as many are choosing to attend the math and science academy at Ocean Lakes High School instead.

== Notable alumni ==
- Tara Buckman, (1974) - retired film and television actress
- Tim Finchem, (1965) - PGA Tour commissioner
- Daniel Hudson, (2005) - Major League Baseball pitcher
- Tony Grimes, (2020) - college football cornerback for the Texas A&M Aggies
- Cedric Humes, (2002) - Virginia Tech football running back; drafted by Pittsburgh Steelers in Round 7, 240th pick of 2006 NFL draft
- Aziaha James (2021) - WNBA player
- Todd Nathanson — (better known as Todd In the Shadows) Internet pop music reviewer
- Juice Newton - pop/country singer; attended Princess Anne High School but graduated from the new First Colonial High School)
- Nabeel Qureshi, (2001) - Evangelical Christian apologist and author
- Curtis Strange - two-time US Open golf champion (1988, 1989); member of the World Golf Hall of Fame
- Frank Wagner - Virginia Senator
- Elizabeth Williams, (2011) - basketball player, Atlanta Dream WNBA center
- Pharrell Williams, (1992) - singer, songwriter, rapper, N*E*R*D frontman and producer in "The Neptunes"

== See also ==
- AAA Eastern Region
- AAA Beach District
- Fabulous Marching Cavaliers
