= Lago Mar, Virginia Beach, Virginia =

Lago Mar
- Neighborhood
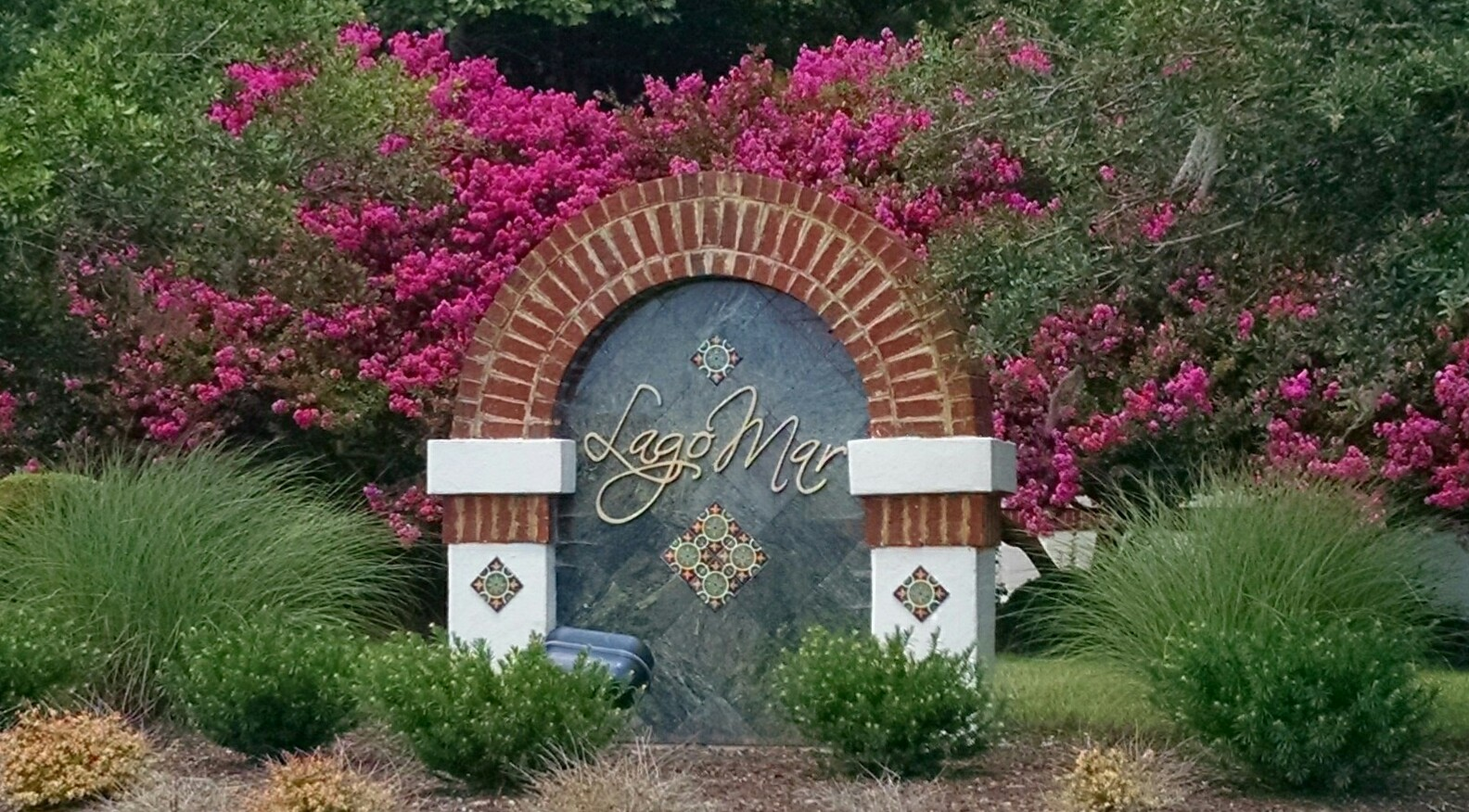
- Entrance to Lago Mar

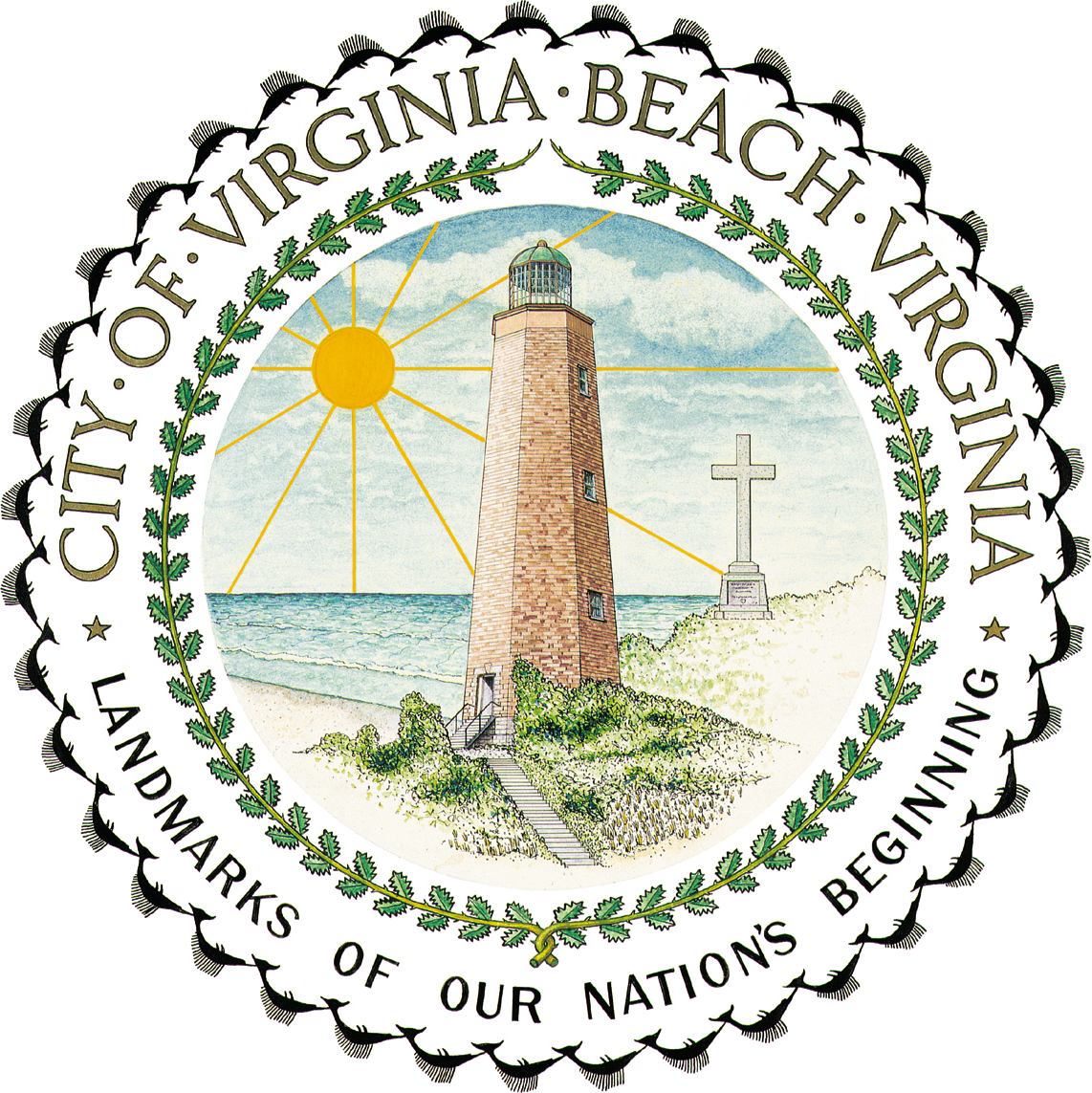
- Seal
- Nickname: "Gateway to Virginia's Outer Banks"
- Location within Virginia Location within the USA
- Coordinates: 36°45′00″N 75°59′00″W
- Country: United States
- State: Virginia
- Elevation: 10 ft (3.0 m)
- Time zone: UTC−5 (Eastern (EST))
  - Summer (DST): UTC−4 (EDT)
- ZIP code: 23456
- Area code: 757, 948
- Website: Lago Mar Civic League

Lago Mar (sometimes spelled Lagomar or LagoMar) is a neighborhood on the north end of the Currituck Sound in the Princess Anne area of southeastern Virginia Beach, Virginia, United States. The name translated from Spanish to English means "lake" and "sea". It is derived from its proximity to the Atlantic Ocean and Brinson's Inlet Lake (originally known as "Salt Pond" and later "Lake Tecumseh"), as well as from the neighboring community of Ocean Lakes. The street names within Lago Mar are also of Spanish origin with the notable exception of Atwoodtown, which is what the area was called prior to being renamed in the 1960s.

== Geography ==
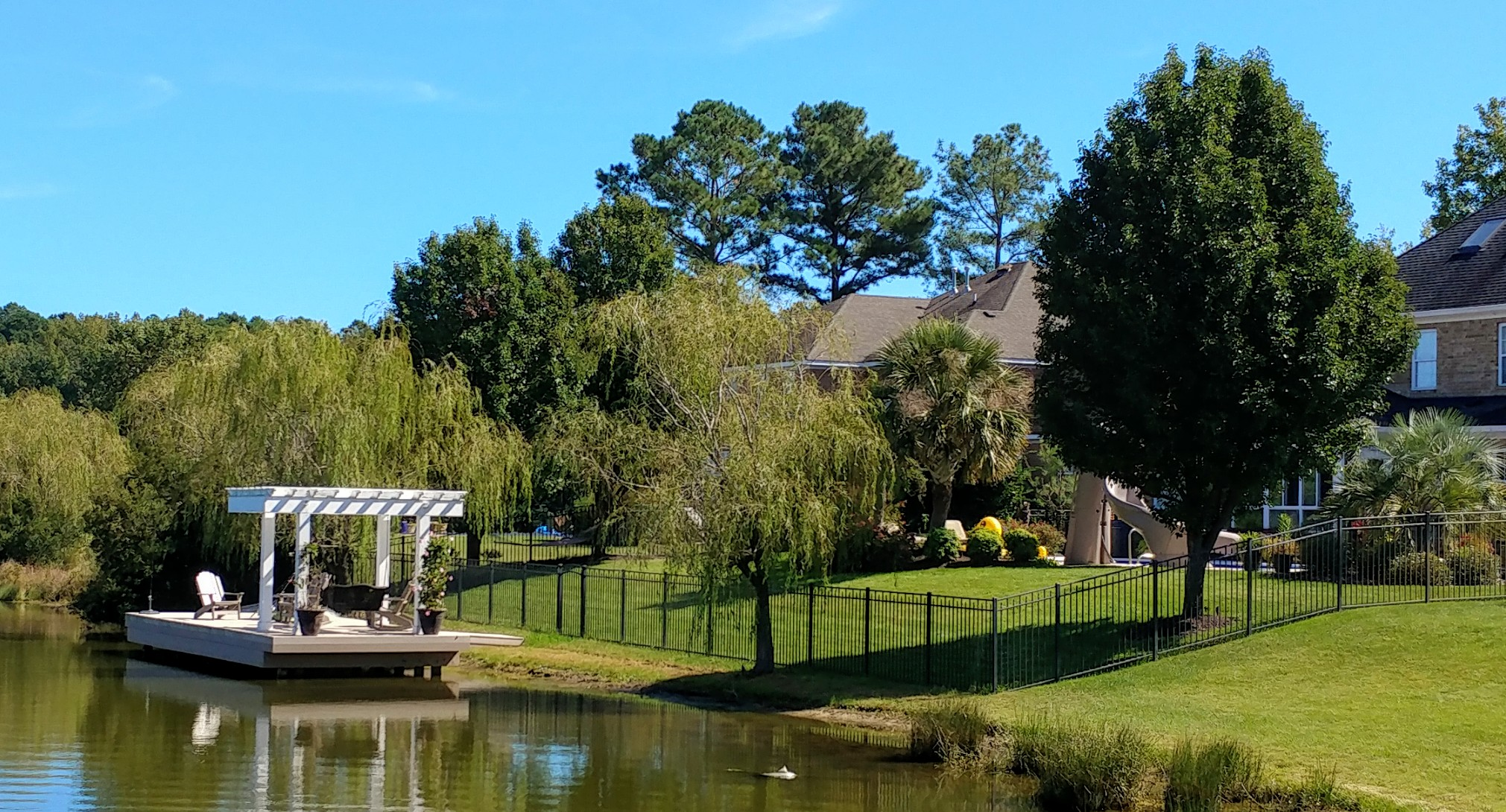
Lakefront in Lago Mar

Lago Mar lies between Nimmo Parkway and Sandbridge Road near Sandbridge in southern Virginia Beach. Sandbridge Road, which forms Lago Mar's southern border, is currently the only public road to access the north end of the Currituck Banks Peninsula. Heading east on Sandbridge Road, Lago Mar is the last neighborhood before entering Sandbridge itself, making Lago Mar "The Gateway to Virginia's Outer Banks". This road is also part of Virginia Beach's "Green Line", which is its boundary for urban growth. Thus Lago Mar lies just where urban conveniences transition into the rural forests and farms of the south.

To the west is the Red Mill Farms area of Princess Anne, which includes the Red Mill Commons shopping complex. To the north is Scopus Marsh and Lake Tecumseh, and beyond that the neighborhood of Ocean Lakes and the Navy's Training Support Center at Dam Neck. To the south lies the Back Bay, the area known as Sigma and the historic village of Pungo. The Back Bay National Wildlife Refuge borders to the east, and there are plans to extend Nimmo Trail through the refuge giving bicyclists and pedestrians access between Lago Mar and Sandbridge Beach.

== History ==
The land currently comprising Lago Mar was inhabited at least as early as the late 1600s. A grave site off Nimmo Trail marks the resting place of three "Stone Brothers" who lived around the turn of the 19th century. Settlers were in the immediate vicinity much earlier than that however, since Lago Mar lies on the banks of "Muddy Creek" (now known as Ashville Bridge Creek), upon which the famous "Witch of Pungo" lived in the late 1600s until her death around 1740.

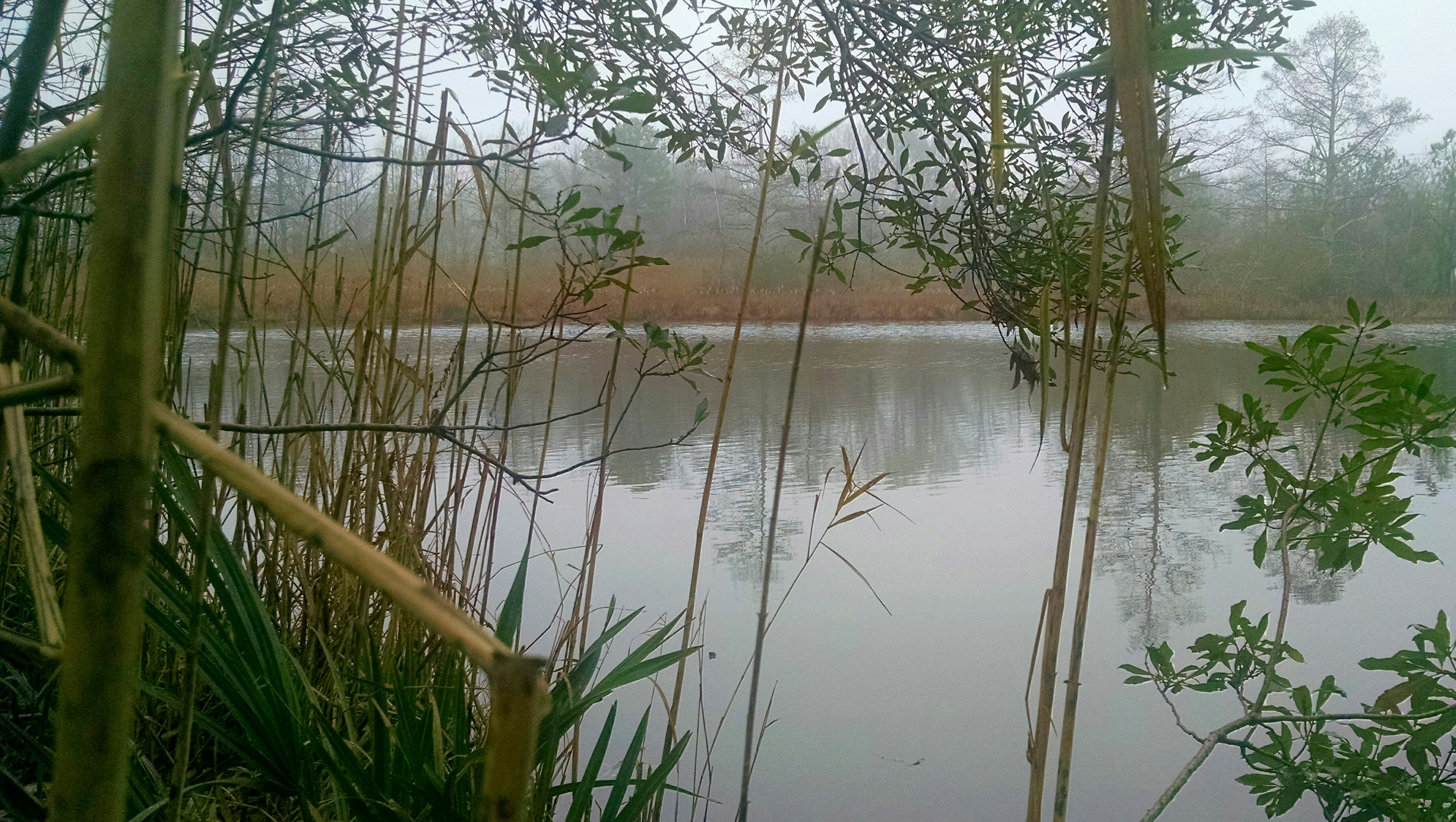
A view of Ashville Bridge Creek

The community of Lago Mar was founded by John Aragona, a successful developer in Princess Anne County and Virginia Beach during the 1950s-70s. He was responsible for developing a great portion of the city, including Diamond Springs, Aragona Village, and Princess Anne Plaza just to name a few. But for his own home, he purchased an 800-acre subdivision between the Beach borough and Sandbridge. He named it Lago Mar, with the purpose of building "luxury homes to repose in a country setting". He constructed a canal upon which he built his own Spanish-style home in 1968.

The canal was initially intended to extend to the Atlantic Ocean, making Lago Mar much like the neighborhoods of his youth in Fort Lauderdale, Florida. However, the Army Corps of Engineers would not allow it to extend beyond Ashville Bridge Creek, thus extending the trip to the Atlantic by boat from a short 2 miles to a much longer trip via Oregon Inlet 75 miles to the south. The Corps represented the Back Bay National Wildlife Refuge, which had spent many years and much funding to create a largely freshwater ecosystem in the years since the closing of several northern inlets between the Ocean and Sound.

Lago Mar's founder died in 1977, but his descendants also became successful entrepreneurs in the area. They carried on his legacy as a developer and also enjoyed success as sponsors and promoters in the Beach music scene. The development of Lago Mar was sold to Aragona's business partner, Edward Garcia Sr, to be operated by False Cape Enterprises. Aragona's original home on the canal still stands on 5 and a half acres of land on Entrada Drive. To this day, Lago Mar maintains a personality "as much connected with water as its canals are to Back Bay".

In the Summer of 1984 the Lago Mar subdivision was featured in the Tidewater Builders Association Homearama. In a nod to the Spanish theme of the neighborhood the event was called Fiesta de las Casas. The homes of Baja Court were featured as that was the only part of the neighborhood completed at that time.

== Education and demographics ==
When Princess Anne County officially became the City of Virginia Beach on January 1, 1963, it was divided into seven boroughs. Lago Mar is in the area formerly known as Princess Anne Borough. In the late 1990s, the city replaced the boroughs with seven Council Districts. Lago Mar is in District 7, known as Princess Anne District, except north of Nimmo Parkway, which is part of District 5. District 7 comprises the entire southern portion of the city, and is currently represented in city council by Barbara Henley. District 5 is represented by Rosemary Wilson, who is also vice mayor.

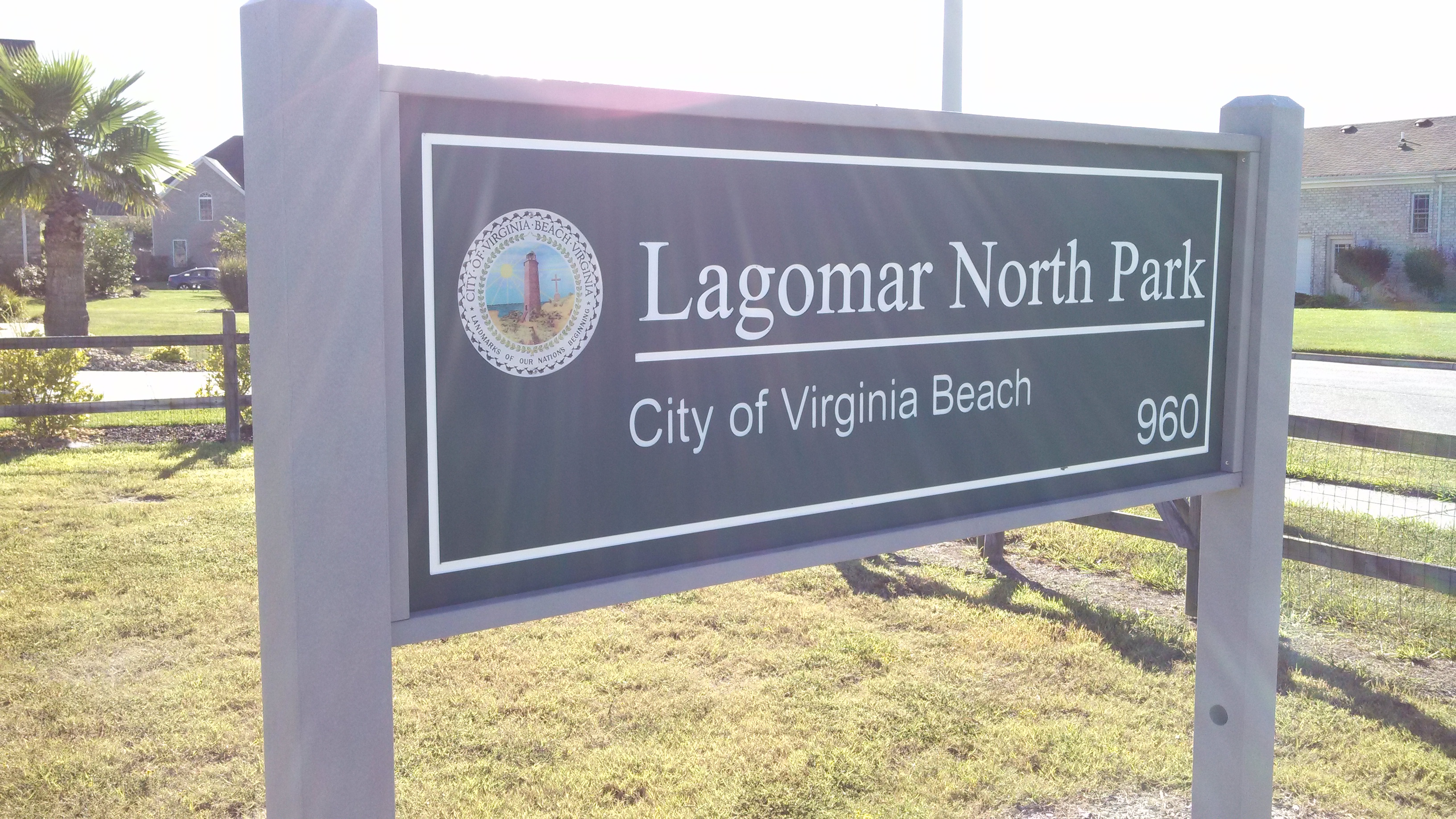
One of three city parks in Lago Mar

Nimmo Trail serves as a dividing line for school districts and voting precincts. The portion of Lago Mar north of Nimmo Trail is also known as Lago Mar Back Bay. Lago Mar is represented by two voting districts. Sigma Precinct 31 includes Lago Mar south of Nimmo Trail as well as Sigma and Sandbridge. Lago Mar north of Nimmo Trail is included along with portions of Ocean Lakes and Dam Neck in Culver Precinct 63.

The area's public school students attend Red Mill Elementary School and Princess Anne Middle School before moving on to Kellam (Lago Mar south of Nimmo Trail) or Ocean Lakes (Lago Mar Back Bay) High School.

With over 43% of its residents reporting their highest level of education to include a bachelor's degree, and 23.2 percent having earned a graduate's degree, Lago Mar is a highly educated community. No surprise then that almost 34 percent of its residents earn over $150,000 a year, making Lago Mar an "upper middle class neighborhood". Unemployment is 4.6%, which is slightly higher than national averages.

As of 2018, there were over 5541 residents, among whom 88% were Caucasian, 3 percent Asian and another 3 percent being of African-American descent. Approximately 97% of Lago Mar residents are homeowners. Country Music singer Alana Springsteen hails from Lago Mar. Perhaps its most famous resident is musician and Grammy Award-winning producer Timbaland.

== Recreation ==
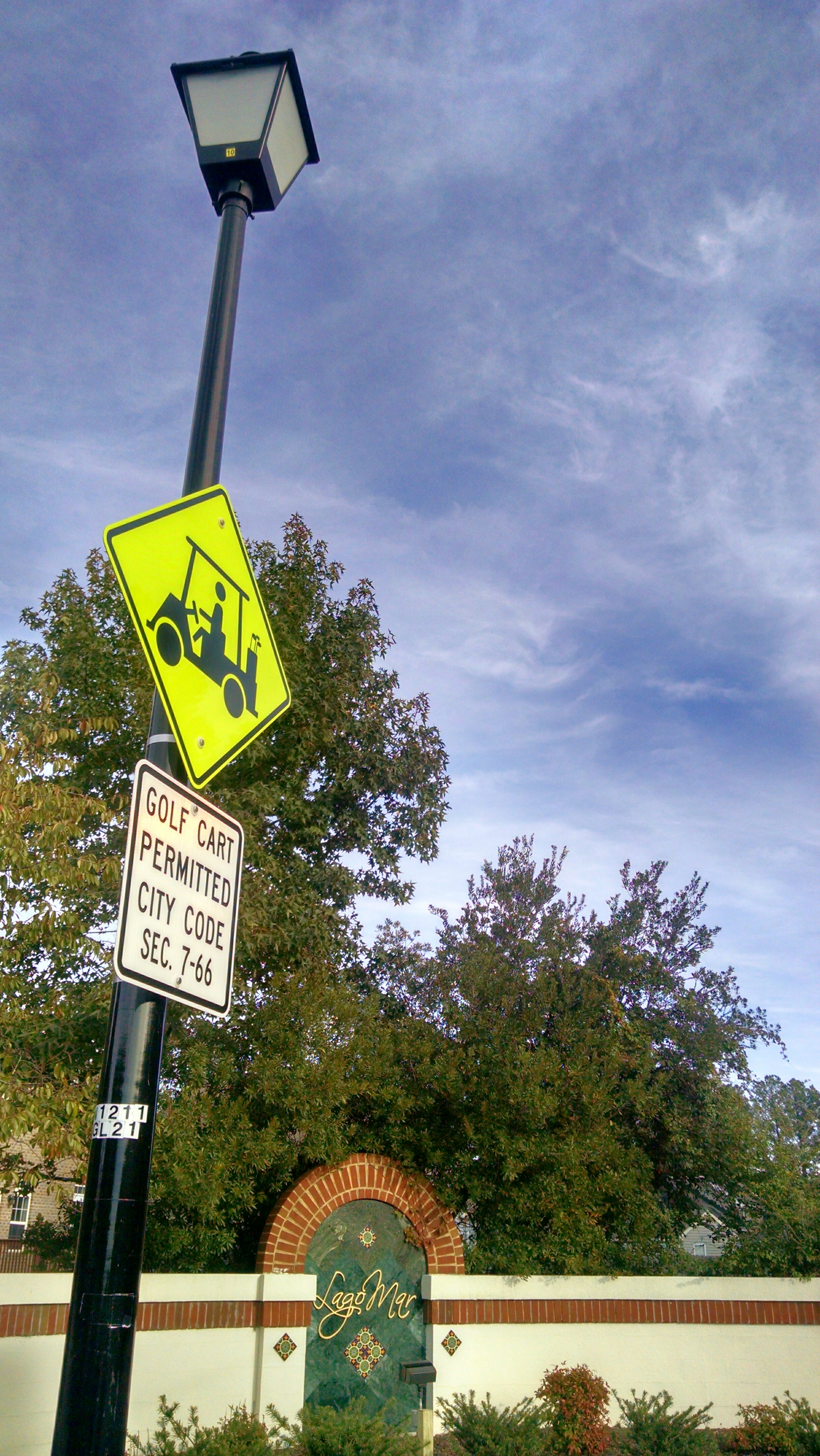
Lago Mar is a Golf Cart Community.

Much of Lago Mar is built around Ashville Bridge Creek, which is a tributary of the Back Bay and is affected by the same wind-driven tides. The entire area is in the Currituck Sound watershed (which is just a small portion of the larger Albemarle watershed according to the US Environmental Protection Agency).

In addition to bordering the Wildlife Refuge, Lago Mar has three family parks within its borders where residents may enjoy playgrounds, picnics, or tennis courts. Bicycling, jogging and walking are other common activities on both Nimmo Trail and the "Lago Mar Loop." Many residents frequent the local Hell's Point Golf Club, which is at the southeast end of the neighborhood. Golf carts are permitted to be driven on all streets in Lago Mar south of Nimmo Trail.

The community Civic League sponsors several annual events, including a 4th of July parade and picnic as well as an Oktoberfest picnic. Lago Mar's local soccer team goes by the name of "Lagomar FC". Many residents are involved in or enjoy attending area festivals.

== Climate and vegetation ==
Like much of the Southeastern United States, the Lago Mar community of Virginia Beach has a humid subtropical climate, characterized by short, relatively mild winters and long, hot and humid summers, but with four distinct seasons. Primarily because of its close proximity to the Atlantic Ocean and location south of the Chesapeake Bay, temperatures are more moderate than those inland, with winters being warmer and with little to no snow.

Annually, Lago Mar residents can expect about 3 inches of snow (although many years can pass without measurable snow) and around 55 inches of rain. Rainfall is abundant throughout the year, but the wettest season is summer, and the driest season is winter. The annual average high temperature is 71 °F (22 °C) and the average low temperature is 55 °F (13 °C). During an average year, the extremes are 100 °F (38 °C) being the hottest, and 18 °F (-8 °C) being the coldest.

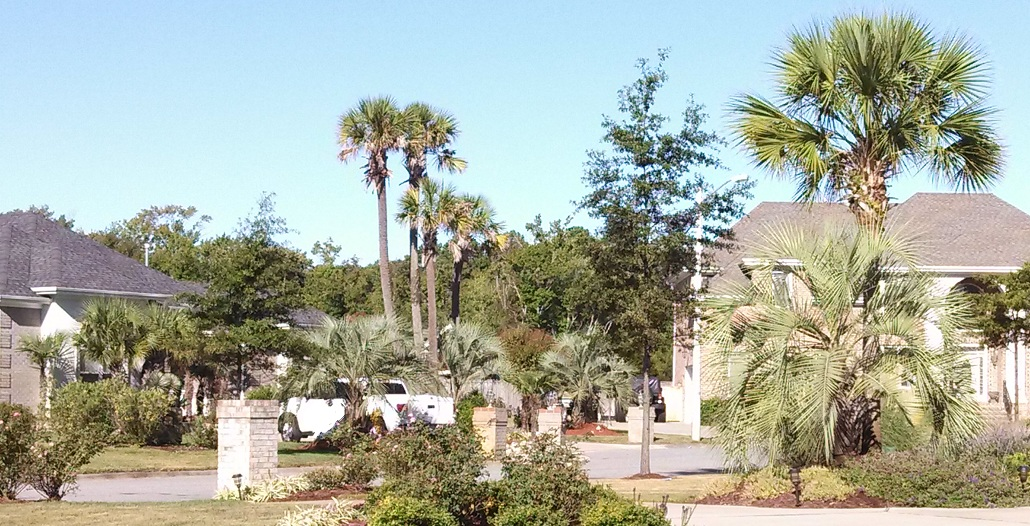
A street scene in Lago Mar

High temperatures top 86 °F (30 °C) a total of 85 times during an average year, and top 90 °F an average 49 times. Residents can also expect freezing temperatures approximately 25 times a year, with December 6 and March 7 being the average first and last freeze dates. Average dates with possibility of a hard freeze (28 °F or below) are December 27 through February 18. Average dates with a possibility of frost (36 °F or below) are November 22 through March 24, giving Lago Mar an average growing season of 240 days or more.

Lago Mar is in USDA hardiness zone 8b, Sunset climate zone 31 (Interior Plains of Gulf Coast and Coastal Southeast), and AHS Heat Zone 7 (60–90 days 86 °F (30 °C) or higher). Most of Lago Mar is in Ecoregion 63d (Virginian Barrier Islands and Coastal Marshes) except a small corner in the southwest which is in 63b (Chesapeake-Pamlico Lowlands and Tidal Marshes). The National Gardening Association lists Lago Mar in the Lower South region.

A wide variety of plants flourish here and can be seen growing throughout the neighborhood, including Camellias, Oleanders, Azaleas and Gardenias. Trees in propagation include Sabal, Pindo, and Windmill palms, hardy banana and cold hardy citrus, persimmons, crepe myrtles, cherry blossoms, and various fig trees. Natives include several varieties of magnolia and other Bays, Loblolly pine, live oak, wax myrtle, bald cypress, sweetgum, Water Tupelo and many other indigenous plants. Much of Lago Mar is well established and there are plants in bloom throughout the year.

Many animal species make their homes in the coastal marshes and forests in and around Lago Mar. It is the northernmost known location for the Monarch butterfly to have overwintered on the East Coast of the United States.

Climate data for Lago Mar, Virginia Beach, Virginia (1996–2026)
Month	Jan	Feb	Mar	Apr	May	Jun	Jul	Aug	Sep	Oct	Nov	Dec	Year
Record high °F (°C)	79 (26)	85 (29)	90 (32)	94 (34)	99 (37)	103 (39)	104 (40)	102 (39)	98 (37)	96 (36)	86 (30)	82 (28)	104 (40)
Mean daily maximum °F (°C)	52 (11)	55 (13)	62 (17)	72 (22)	79 (26)	86 (30)	90 (32)	88 (31)	82 (28)	73 (23)	63 (17)	56 (13)	72 (22)
Mean daily minimum °F (°C)	36 (2)	38 (3)	44 (7)	52 (11)	61 (16)	70 (21)	74 (23)	73 (23)	68 (20)	58 (14)	47 (8)	40 (4)	55 (13)
Record low °F (°C)	12 (−11)	11 (−12)	22 (−6)	33 (1)	42 (6)	51 (11)	60 (16)	60 (16)	52 (11)	37 (3)	28 (−2)	15 (−9)	11 (−12)
Average precipitation inches (mm)	3.45 (87.63)	3.51 (89.154)	3.71 (94.234)	4.04 (102.616)	4.49 (114.046)	4.95 (125.73)	6.86 (174.244)	5.93 (150.622)	6.38 (162.052)	3.89 (98.806)	3.69 (93.726)	4.23 (107.442)	55.13 (1,400.302)
Average snowfall inches (mm)	2.01 (51.054)	0.84 (21.336)	0.05 (1.27)	0.00 (0.1016)	0.0 (0.0)	0.0 (0.0)	0.0 (0.0)	0.0 (0.0)	0.0 (0.0)	0.0 (0.0)	0.0 (0.0)	0.50 (12.7)	3.4 (86.4616)
Source: Lago Mar Weather
