= Carova Beach, North Carolina =

Unincorporated community in North Carolina, US

Coordinates: 36°31′42.74″N 75°51′47.56″W

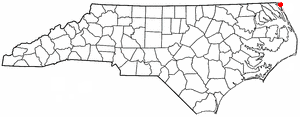

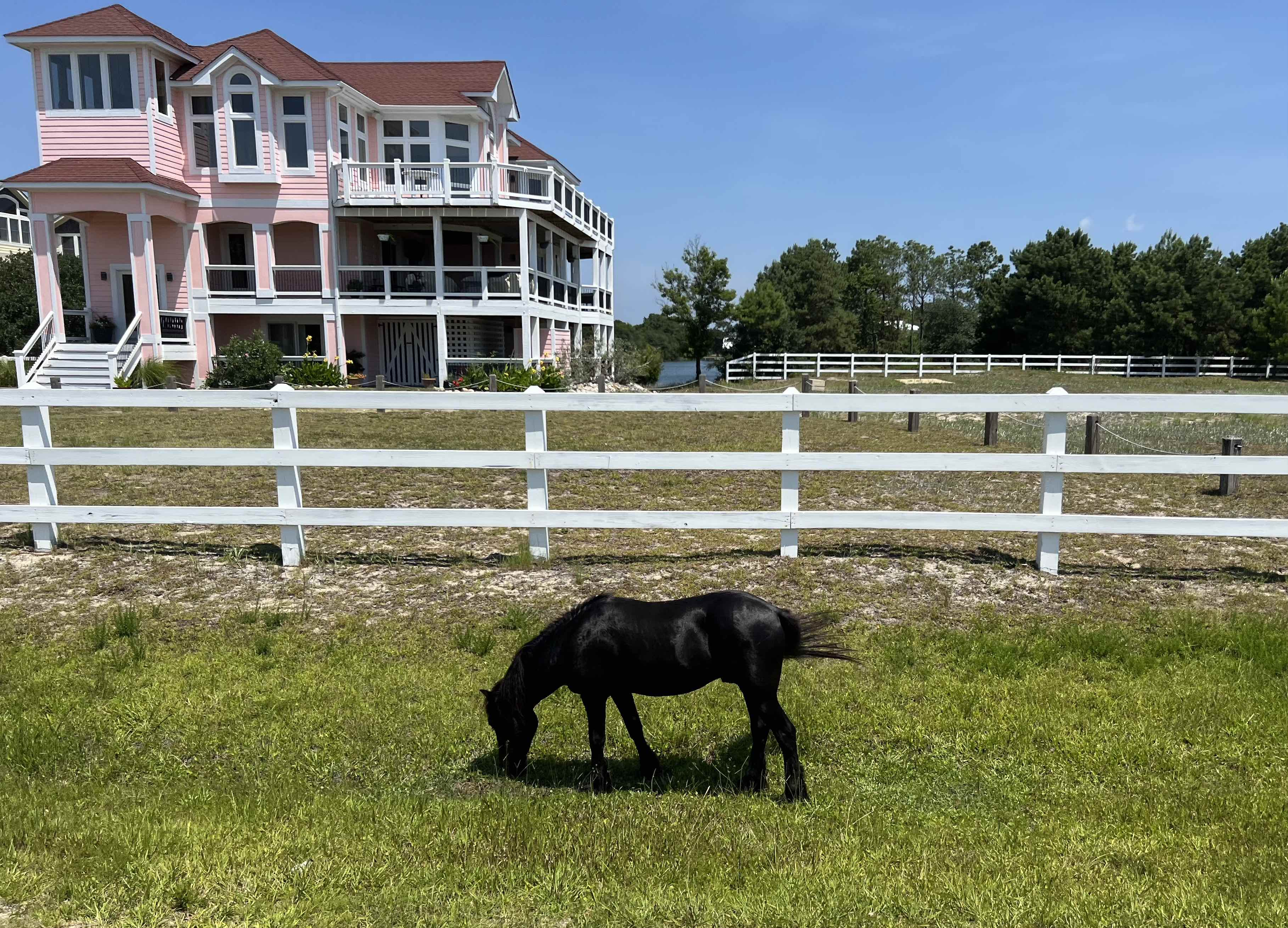
A young, male wild horse in Carova.

Carova Beach or Carova is an unincorporated community in Currituck County in the extreme northeastern corner of North Carolina, United States. The community, begun in the 1960s, is found on Currituck Banks, north of Bodie Island, and can be accessed only by boat or by four-wheel drive vehicle. There are no paved roads connecting Carova to the town of Corolla, North Carolina. The neighboring settlement of Sandbridge in Virginia Beach, Virginia, is not accessible by vehicle from Carova.

The community's name derives from the portmanteau of the first syllables of Carolina and Virginia, since the coastal community lies just south of the North Carolina-Virginia state line. Thus, it is the northernmost of the Outer Banks communities of North Carolina. Historically the Currituck Inlet which served as the boundary between Virginia and North Carolina existed where the community of Carova now stands. The inlet closed in 1730s.

In the 1960s, when development began in Carova, there were plans to construct a paved road from Sandbridge south to Carova through the Back Bay National Wildlife Refuge, but these never materialized. Today, there is a permanent fence from ocean to sound to keep vehicles from crossing and, more importantly, to keep the feral horses from migrating to the Virginia side of the border. To reach Carova, four-wheel drive vehicles must drive north along the beach from Corolla into the community, as access from Virginia is limited to pedestrians and bicyclists.

Banker horses and other wildlife roam freely on the beaches of Carova. There is an enforced law on the beach that states that no one is to get within 50 feet (15 m) of the horses. Carova only has approximately 50 year-round residents and commercialism is absent from this section of the Outer Banks; there are no restaurants, shops, or other attractions that often accompany beach communities. There are approximately 740 beach homes, many of which are weekly rentals, and otherwise only a fire/EMS station and a refuse station. Developers continue to build in the area.

Flooding is a continual problem that worsens with each bad storm in Carova Beach, where summer tourist traffic is heavy on roads that are little more than uneven sand paths through the dunes. Sandfiddler Road and Sandpiper Road, the two primary routes through the community, become nearly impassable after heavy rains, when large potholes fill with water. During hurricanes and tropical storms the community can become inaccessible when the beach is awash due to storm surge.

Although some residents of Carova are opposed to a paved road being built to the community, the Currituck County Commission is in favor of constructing a paved road to Carova. They say a road is essential for the county to continue providing services like garbage collection, housing inspections, and emergency response. A road to connect Carova to the rest of Currituck County would have to cut through the 8,316 acre Currituck National Wildlife Refuge that stretches for 11 miles along the Currituck Banks between Corolla and Carova and any effort to build a road through the refuge would likely face stiff opposition from environmentalists.

== Climate ==
According to the Trewartha climate classification system, Carova Beach, North Carolina has a humid subtropical climate with hot and humid summers, cool winters and year-around precipitation (Cfak). Cfak climates are characterized by all months having an average mean temperature > 32.0 °F (> 0.0 °C), at least eight months with an average mean temperature ≥ 50.0 °F (≥ 10.0 °C), at least one month with an average mean temperature ≥ 71.6 °F (≥ 22.0 °C) and no significant precipitation difference between seasons. During the summer months in Carova Beach, a cooling afternoon sea breeze is present on most days, but episodes of extreme heat and humidity can occur with heat index values ≥ 100 °F (≥ 38 °C). Carova Beach is prone to hurricane strikes, particularly during the Atlantic hurricane season which extends from June 1 through November 30, sharply peaking from late August through September. During the winter months, episodes of cold and wind can occur with wind chill values < 10 °F (< -12 °C). The plant hardiness zone at Carova Beach is 8a with an average annual extreme minimum air temperature of 14.1 °F (-9.9 °C). The average seasonal (Dec-Mar) snowfall total is < 2 inches (< 5 cm), and the average annual peak in nor'easter activity is in February.

Climate data for Carova Beach, NC (1991-2020 Averages)
Month	Jan	Feb	Mar	Apr	May	Jun	Jul	Aug	Sep	Oct	Nov	Dec	Year
Mean daily maximum °F (°C)	49.7 (9.8)	51.1 (10.6)	56.9 (13.8)	66.5 (19.2)	73.8 (23.2)	81.4 (27.4)	85.5 (29.7)	84.1 (28.9)	79.1 (26.2)	70.9 (21.6)	60.5 (15.8)	53.6 (12.0)	67.7 (19.8)
Daily mean °F (°C)	42.5 (5.8)	43.9 (6.6)	49.5 (9.7)	58.8 (14.9)	66.9 (19.4)	75.3 (24.1)	79.6 (26.4)	78.4 (25.8)	73.8 (23.2)	64.2 (17.9)	53.5 (11.9)	46.7 (8.2)	61.1 (16.2)
Mean daily minimum °F (°C)	35.4 (1.9)	36.8 (2.7)	42.1 (5.6)	51.2 (10.7)	60 (16)	69.2 (20.7)	73.8 (23.2)	72.8 (22.7)	68.4 (20.2)	57.6 (14.2)	46.4 (8.0)	39.8 (4.3)	54.5 (12.5)
Average precipitation inches (mm)	3.62 (92)	2.93 (74)	3.75 (95)	3.51 (89)	3.46 (88)	3.64 (92)	5.40 (137)	5.36 (136)	5.12 (130)	3.74 (95)	3.17 (81)	3.49 (89)	47.19 (1,199)
Average relative humidity (%)	69.9	69.8	67.0	67.2	70.9	74.1	75.5	75.2	74.5	72.0	72.9	72.0	71.8
Average dew point °F (°C)	33.8 (1.0)	34.6 (1.4)	39.3 (4.1)	48.1 (8.9)	57.4 (14.1)	66.2 (19.0)	71.2 (21.8)	70.3 (21.3)	65.6 (18.7)	55.4 (13.0)	45.0 (7.2)	38.5 (3.6)	52.1 (11.2)
Source: PRISM

Climate data for Duck, NC Ocean Water Temperature (24 S Carova Beach)
Month	Jan	Feb	Mar	Apr	May	Jun	Jul	Aug	Sep	Oct	Nov	Dec	Year
Daily mean °F (°C)	45 (7)	44 (7)	46 (8)	59 (15)	67 (19)	74 (23)	71 (22)	74 (23)	75 (24)	69 (21)	59 (15)	52 (11)	61 (16)
Source: NOAA

== Ecology ==
According to the A. W. Kuchler U.S. potential natural vegetation types, Carova Beach, North Carolina would have a dominant vegetation type of Northern Cordgrass (73) with a dominant vegetation form of Coastal Prairie (20).
