= Princess Anne, Virginia =

Princess Anne
- Unincorporated community
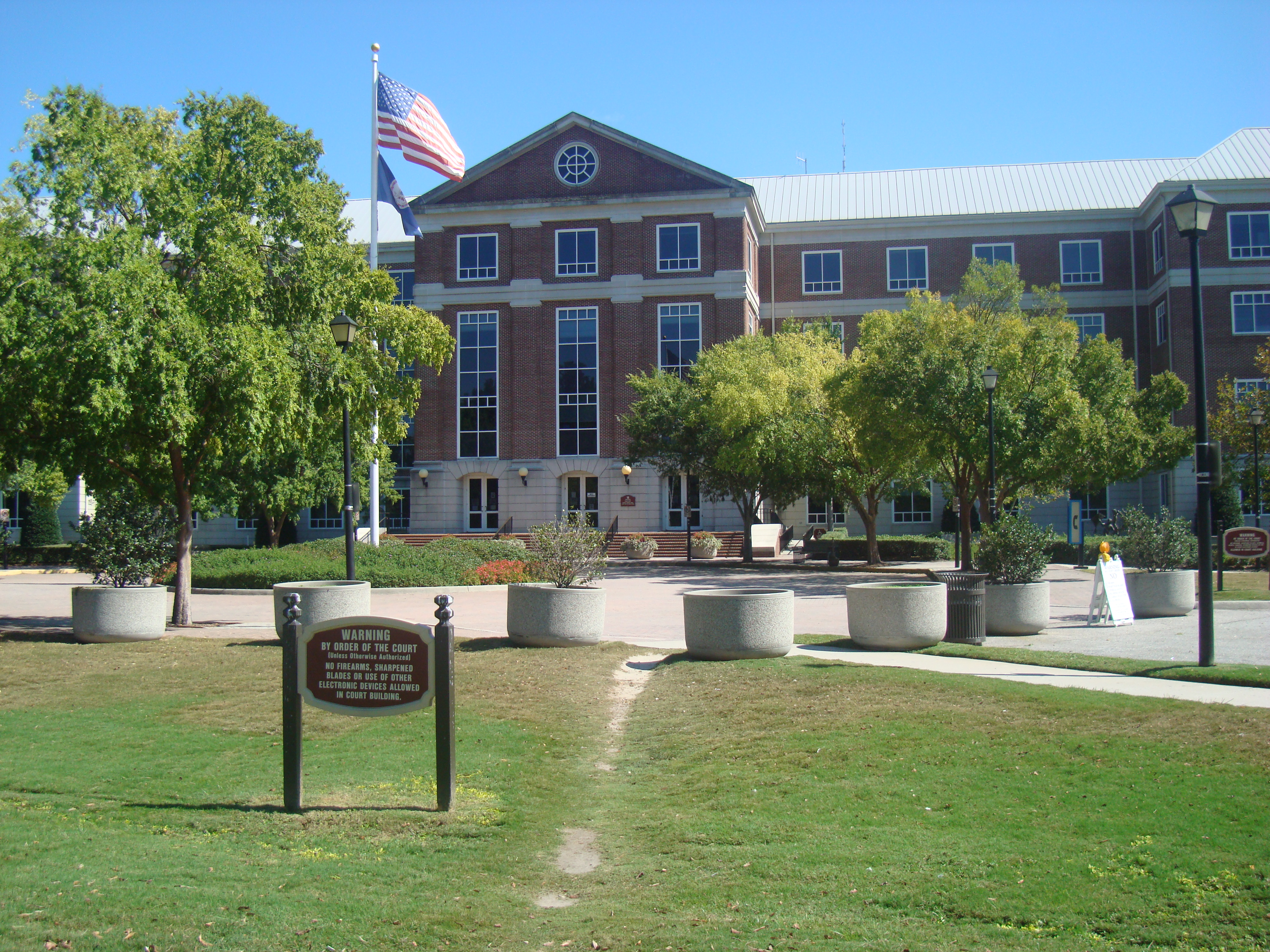
- Building 10, a courthouse, Virginia Beach Municipal Center

- Location within the state of Virginia Princess Anne (the United States)
- Coordinates: 36°45′6″N 76°3′11″W
- Country: United States
- State: Virginia
- Independent city: Virginia Beach
- Princess Anne Shire: 1691
- Time zone: UTC−5 (Eastern (EST))
  - Summer (DST): UTC−4 (EDT)
- ZIP codes: 23453 23454 23456 23457
- Area codes: 757, 948

Princess Anne is a community located in the independent city of Virginia Beach, Virginia, United States at the junction of Princess Anne Road and North Landing Road near the West Neck River. The community, which dates from 1691, was named after Princess Anne of Denmark and Norway (later Anne, Queen of Great Britain, 1665–1714).

The community is the site of the Virginia Beach Municipal Center, where most of the city offices are located, including city hall. Traffic is a major concern for the area as the Municipal Center is a major employment center that is only accessible by two-lane roads.

In 1691, Lower Norfolk County was split roughly in half. The western half became Norfolk County, while the eastern half became Princess Anne Shire, later known as Princess Anne County. Between 1691 and the consolidation of Virginia Beach and Princess Anne County in 1963, this community served as the county seat and was sometimes referred to as Princess Anne Courthouse. The old courthouse dates to the 17th century. Despite its name, Princess Anne High School is not located in the Princess Anne section of Virginia Beach. Princess Anne Elementary School and Princess Anne Middle School however, are located in Princess Anne just a short distance from the Municipal Center.

Subdivisions in the general area include: Ashby's Bridge, Asheville Park, Castleton, Christopher Farms, Courthouse Estates, The Estates at Munden Farms, Heritage Park, Highgate Crossing, Highgate Greens, Holland Oaks, Holland Woods, Hunt Club Forest, Indian River Plantation, Lago Mar, Lake Placid, Mayberry, Pine Ridge, Prince George Estates, Princess Anne Woods, Red Mill Farms, Rollingwood, Sherwood Lakes, Strawbridge, Three Oaks and others.

The area boasts an exceptional crime rate, as well as access to some of the best schools in the Virginia Beach City Public Schools system, including Kellam. Its location, in close vicinity to Pungo, the Virginia Beach oceanfront, as well as the coastal community, Sandbridge keeps the area in high demand among new residents.

Like much of the Southeastern United States, the Princess Anne area of Virginia Beach has a subtropical climate, characterized by short, relatively mild winters and long, hot and humid summers. Primarily because of its close proximity to the Atlantic Ocean and location south of the Chesapeake Bay, temperatures are more moderate than those inland, with winters being warmer and averaging only 3 to 4 inches of snow per year. Annually, Princess Anne residents can expect more than 50 inches of rain.

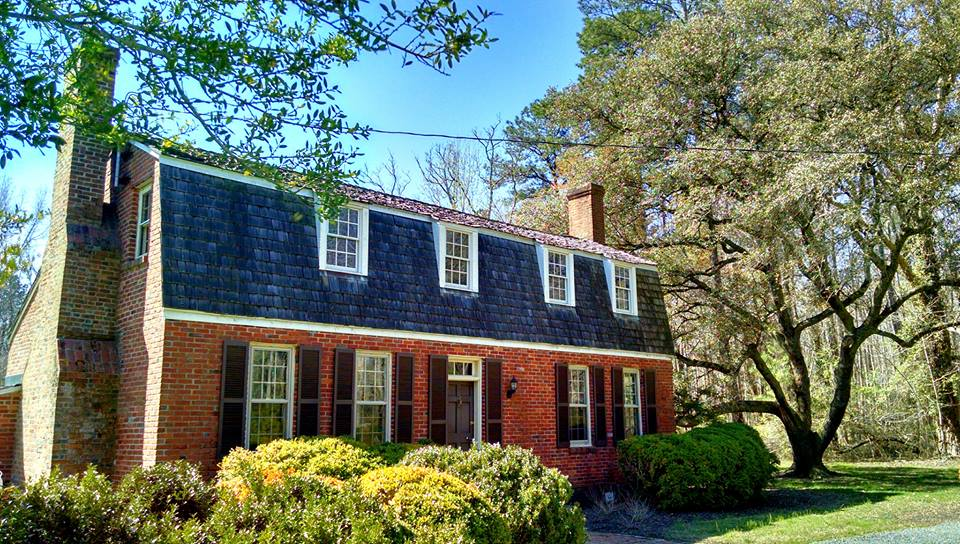
Whitehurst Buffington House at Princess Anne Courthouse

A wide variety of plants flourish here and can be seen growing throughout the area, including Camellias, Oleanders, Azaleas and Gardenias. Trees include Sabal and Windmill palms, live oak, crepe myrtles, and various magnolia, cherry blossom and fig trees. Loblolly pine, bald cypress, wax myrtle, sweetgum and many other indigenous plants are prevalent as well. Several areas in Princess Anne such as Courthouse and Lago Mar are well established and there are plants in bloom throughout the year.

Climate data for Princess Anne, Virginia Beach, VA (1996–2025)
Month	Jan	Feb	Mar	Apr	May	Jun	Jul	Aug	Sep	Oct	Nov	Dec	Year
Record high °F (°C)	79 (26)	85 (29)	88 (31)	94 (34)	99 (37)	103 (39)	104 (40)	102 (39)	98 (37)	96 (36)	86 (30)	82 (28)	104 (40)
Mean daily maximum °F (°C)	52 (11)	55 (13)	62 (17)	71 (22)	79 (26)	86 (30)	90 (32)	88 (31)	82 (28)	73 (23)	63 (17)	56 (13)	71 (22)
Mean daily minimum °F (°C)	36 (2)	38 (3)	44 (7)	52 (11)	61 (16)	70 (21)	74 (23)	73 (23)	68 (20)	58 (14)	47 (8)	40 (4)	55 (13)
Record low °F (°C)	12 (−11)	11 (−12)	22 (−6)	33 (1)	42 (6)	51 (11)	60 (16)	60 (16)	52 (11)	37 (3)	28 (−2)	15 (−9)	11 (−12)
Average precipitation inches (mm)	3.50 (88.9)	3.53 (89.662)	3.79 (96.266)	4.11 (104.394)	4.49 (114.046)	5.01 (127.254)	6.78 (172.212)	6.07 (154.178)	6.38 (162.052)	3.95 (100.33)	3.69 (93.726)	4.29 (108.966)	55.59 (1,411.986)
Average snowfall inches (mm)	2.01 (51.054)	0.87 (22.098)	0.06 (1.524)	0.00 (0.1016)	0.0 (0.0)	0.0 (0.0)	0.0 (0.0)	0.0 (0.0)	0.0 (0.0)	0.0 (0.0)	0.0 (0.0)	0.51 (12.954)	3.45 (87.7316)
Source: Princess Anne Weather
