= Sigma, Virginia =

Sigma
- Unincorporated community
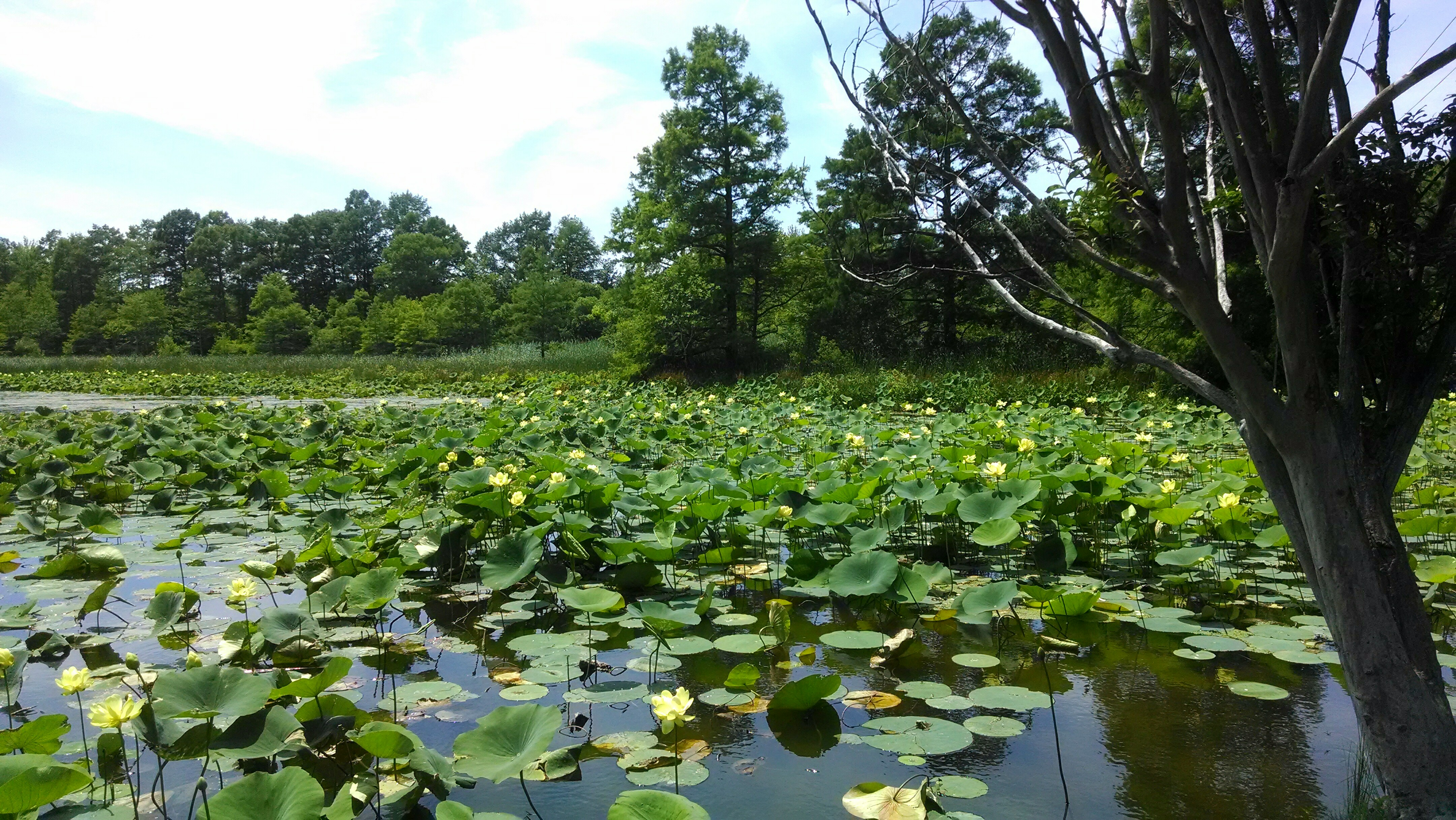
- American Lotus in Sigma area of Virginia Beach

- Location within the Commonwealth of Virginia Sigma (the United States)
- Coordinates: 36°43′55″N 75°59′10″W
- Country: United States
- State: Virginia
- Independent city: Virginia Beach
- Time zone: UTC−5 (Eastern (EST))
  - Summer (DST): UTC−4 (EDT)
- GNIS feature ID: 1497153

Sigma is a community near Sandbridge in the independent city of Virginia Beach, Virginia, United States. Sigma lies just south of Lago Mar on Ashville Bridge Creek along Sandbridge Road at its intersection with New Bridge Road.

The Back Bay National Wildlife Refuge has its administrative building on Sandbridge Road, and there is a large native garden of American Lotus across the street on a tributary of the Currituck Sound. Tabernacle United Methodist Church and Margie and Ray's Crabhouse are landmarks in the Sigma area.

Like much of the Southeastern United States, the Sigma area of Virginia Beach has a subtropical climate, characterized by short, relatively mild winters and long, hot and humid summers. Daytime high temperatures in July average around 90 °F (32 °C) and in January, daytime temperatures average around 52 °F (11 °C).

Climate data for Sigma, Virginia Beach, VA (1996–2025)
Month	Jan	Feb	Mar	Apr	May	Jun	Jul	Aug	Sep	Oct	Nov	Dec	Year
Record high °F (°C)	79 (26)	85 (29)	88 (31)	94 (34)	99 (37)	103 (39)	104 (40)	102 (39)	98 (37)	96 (36)	86 (30)	82 (28)	104 (40)
Mean daily maximum °F (°C)	52 (11)	55 (13)	62 (17)	71 (22)	79 (26)	86 (30)	90 (32)	88 (31)	82 (28)	73 (23)	63 (17)	56 (13)	71 (22)
Mean daily minimum °F (°C)	36 (2)	38 (3)	44 (7)	52 (11)	61 (16)	70 (21)	74 (23)	73 (23)	68 (20)	58 (14)	47 (8)	40 (4)	55 (13)
Record low °F (°C)	12 (−11)	11 (−12)	22 (−6)	33 (1)	42 (6)	51 (11)	60 (16)	60 (16)	52 (11)	37 (3)	28 (−2)	15 (−9)	11 (−12)
Average precipitation inches (mm)	3.50 (88.9)	3.53 (89.662)	3.79 (96.266)	4.11 (104.394)	4.49 (114.046)	5.01 (127.254)	6.78 (172.212)	6.07 (154.178)	6.38 (162.052)	3.95 (100.33)	3.69 (93.726)	4.29 (108.966)	55.59 (1,411.986)
Average snowfall inches (mm)	2.01 (51.054)	0.87 (22.098)	0.06 (1.524)	0.00 (0.1016)	0.0 (0.0)	0.0 (0.0)	0.0 (0.0)	0.0 (0.0)	0.0 (0.0)	0.0 (0.0)	0.0 (0.0)	0.51 (12.954)	3.45 (87.7316)
Source: Sigma Weather

== Gallery ==
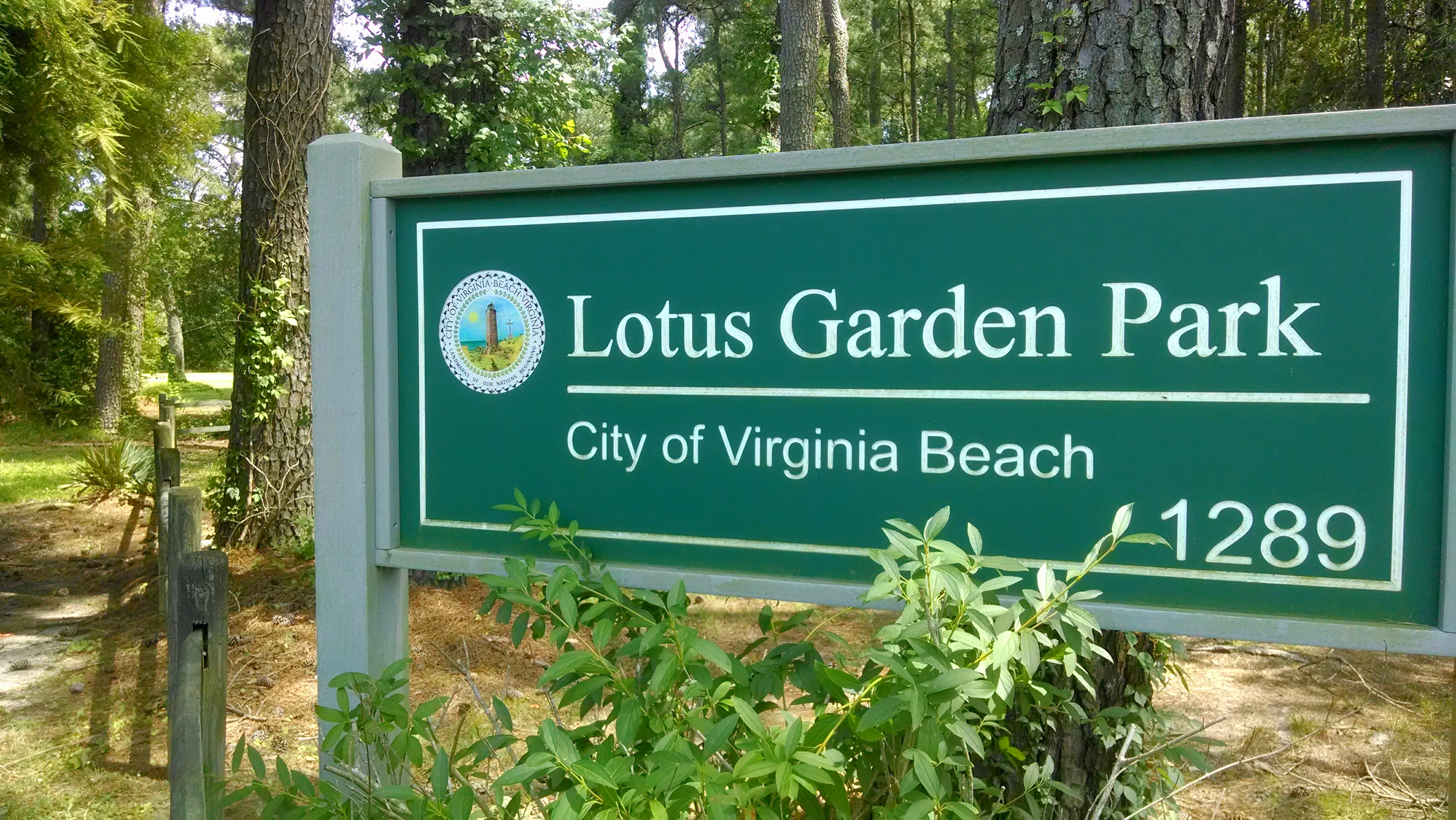
Lotus Garden Park in Sigma area of Virginia Beach

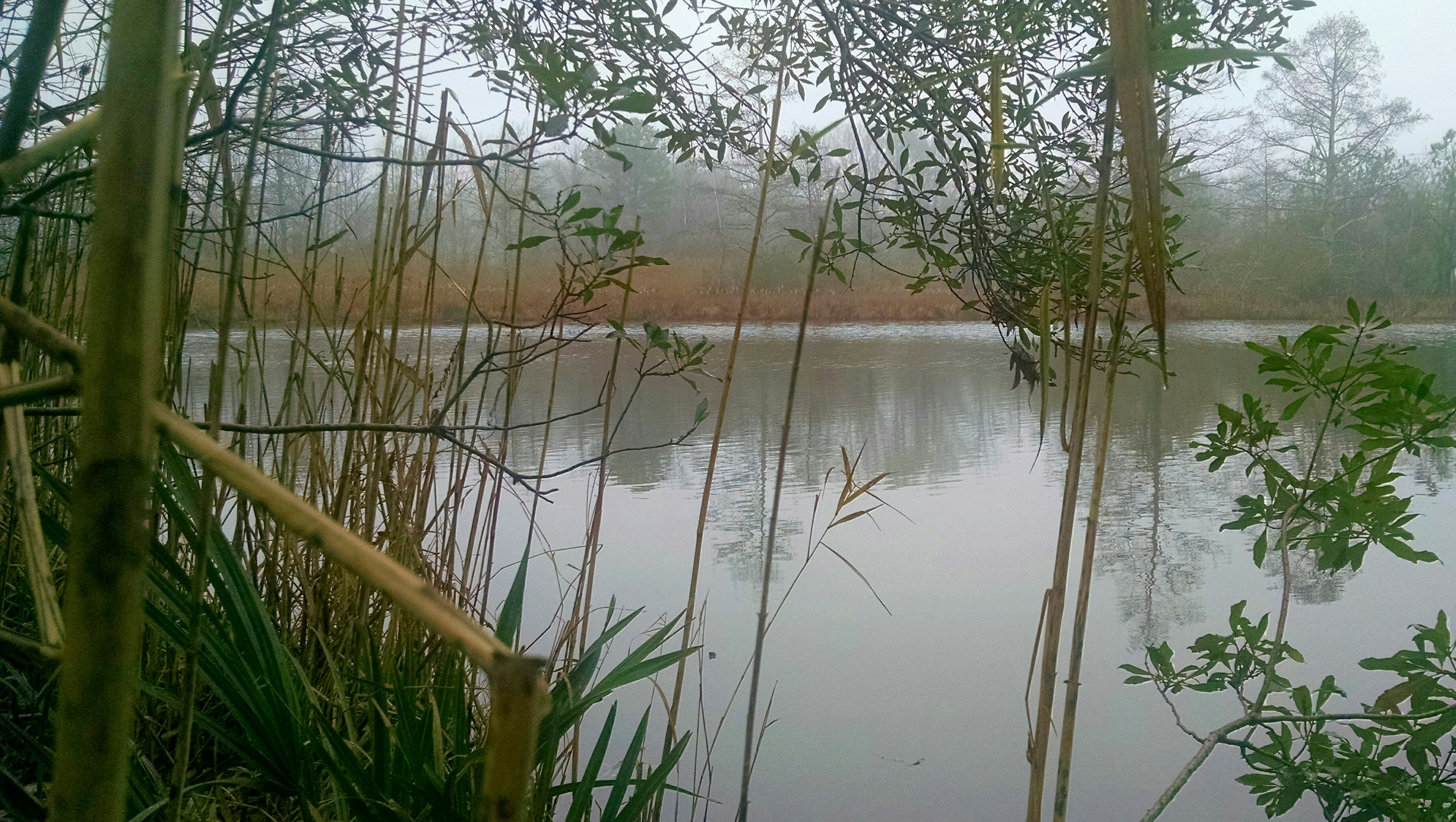
Ashville Bridge Creek in Sigma

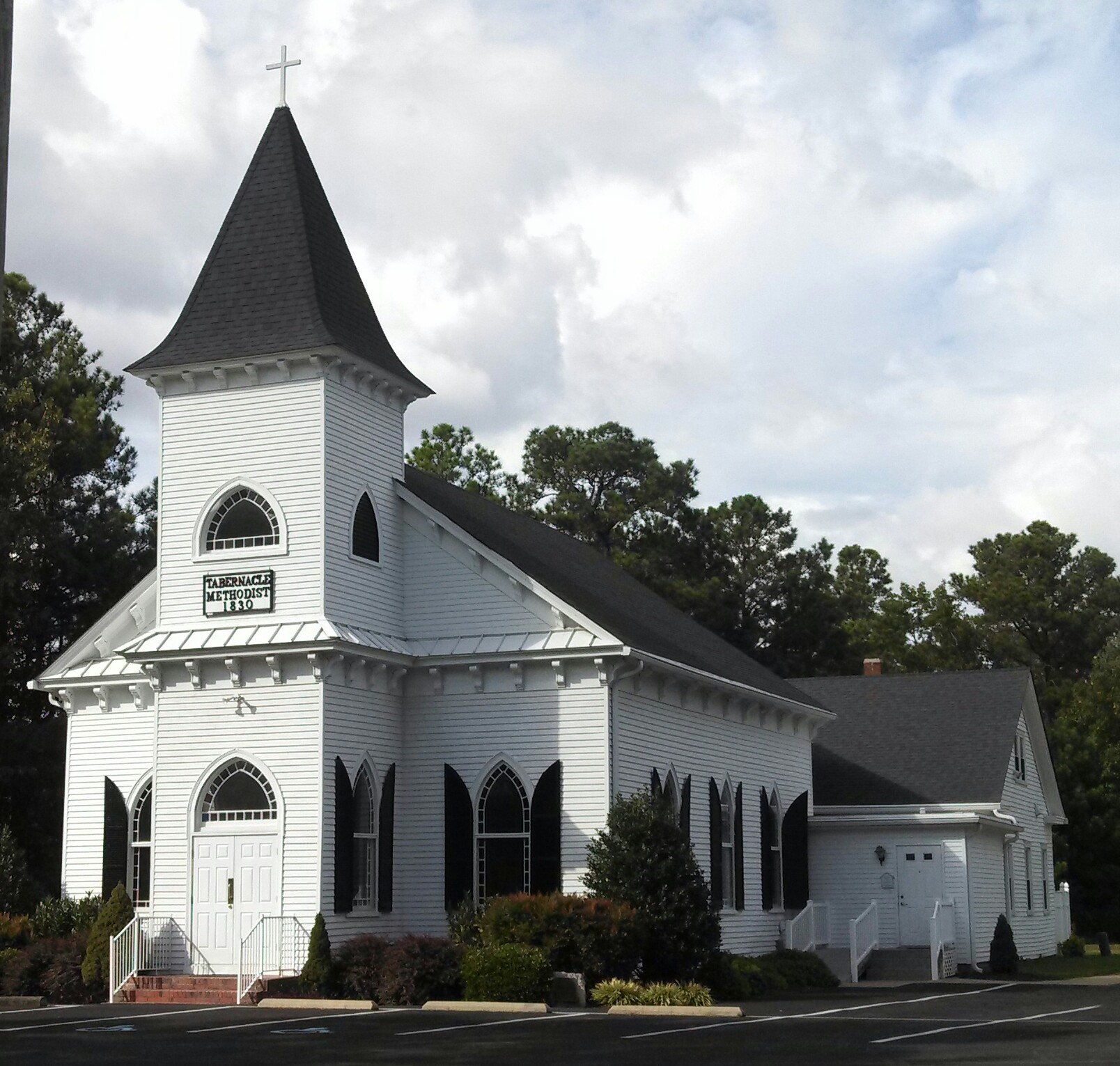
Tabernacle Methodist on Sandbridge Rd near Sigma, VA

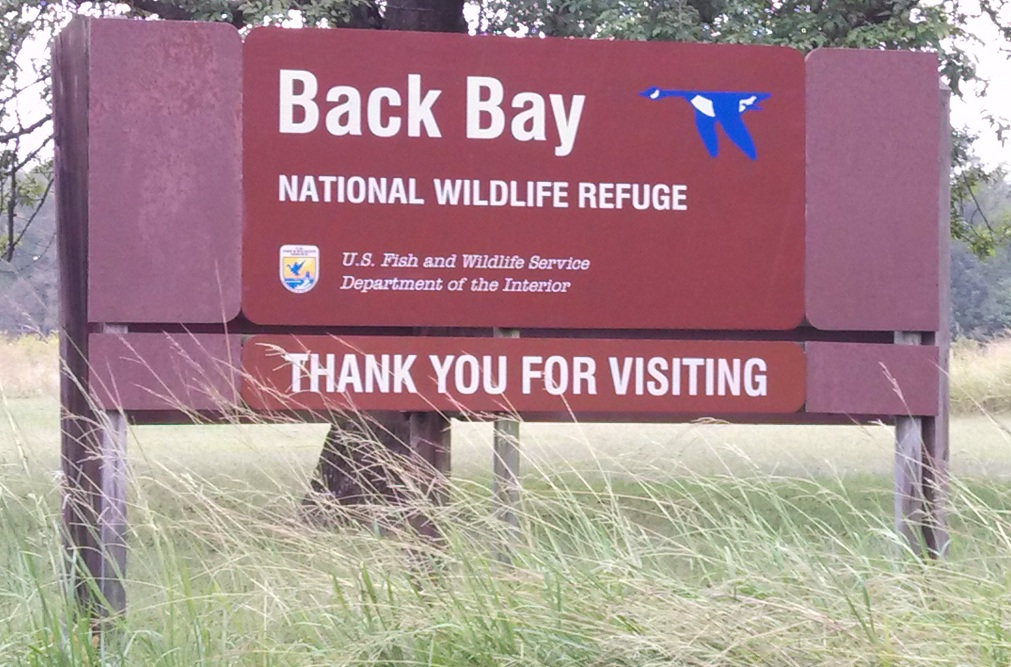
Back Bay NWR headquarters on Sandbridge Road near Sigma, VA
