= Princess Anne County, Virginia =

Former county in Virginia, United States

Coordinates: 36.751689°N 76.054028°W

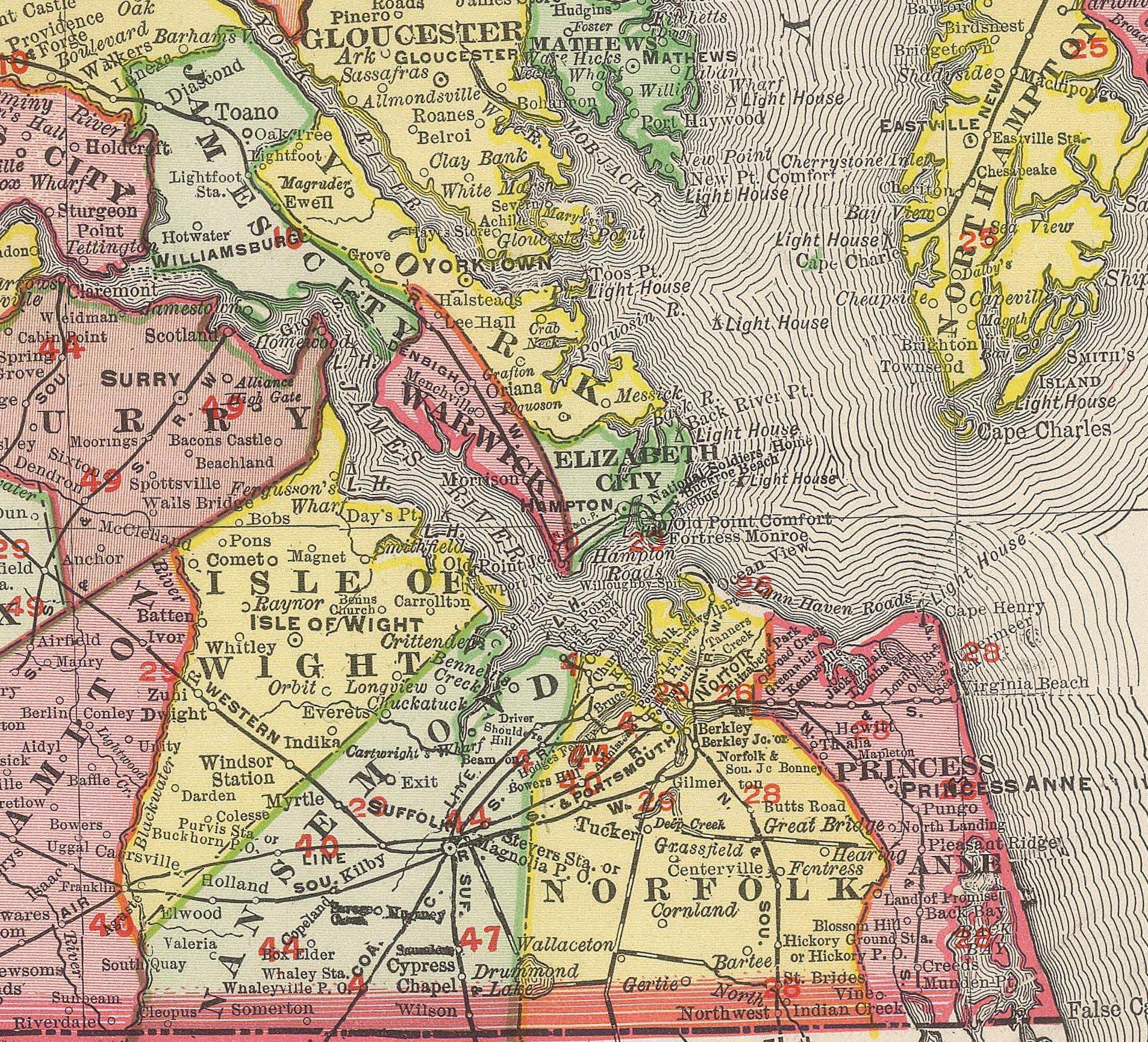
1903 Map depicting Princess Anne County (1691–1963) and other "lost counties" of Virginia.

County of Princess Anne is a former county in the British Colony of Virginia and the Commonwealth of Virginia in the United States, first incorporated in 1691. The county was merged into the independent city of Virginia Beach on January 1, 1963, ceasing to exist.

Historical population
Census	Pop.	Note	%±
1790	7,793		—
1800	8,859		13.7%
1810	9,498		7.2%
1820	8,768		−7.7%
1830	9,102		3.8%
1840	7,285		−20.0%
1850	7,669		5.3%
1860	7,714		0.6%
1870	8,273		7.2%
1880	9,394		13.6%
1890	9,510		1.2%
1900	11,192		17.7%
1910	11,526		3.0%
1920	13,626		18.2%
1930	16,282		19.5%
1940	19,984		22.7%
1950	42,277		111.6%
1960	77,127		82.4%
1790-1960 Population as Princess Anne County

== Shires and counties ==
When Admiral Christopher Newport and the colonists of the Virginia Company arrived in 1607, George Percy and his fellow Englishmen's "first landing" was at Cape Henry in what was to become Princess Anne County. They named the spot in honor of Henry Frederick Stuart, the elder of two surviving sons of King James I of England. A few days later, they travelled up the James River and established Jamestown. During the early 17th century, English settlers explored and began settling the areas adjacent to Hampton Roads. By 1610, the English colonists had established a permanent settlement in the Kecoughtan area of what was to become Elizabeth Cittie (sic) in 1619. Today a part of Hampton, it is the oldest known continuously occupied English settlement in North America.

Adam Thoroughgood was an early leader in the area which became Princess Anne County, settling along the Lynnhaven River. In 1634, the King of England directed the formation of eight shires (or counties) in the colony of Virginia. One of these was Elizabeth City Shire, which included land area on both sides of Hampton Roads.

New Norfolk County was formed in 1636 from Elizabeth City Shire. New Norfolk County included all the area in South Hampton Roads. Only a year later, New Norfolk was split roughly in half into Upper Norfolk County (most of which is now the present-day city of Suffolk) and Lower Norfolk County. In 1691, Lower Norfolk was split roughly in half. The western half became Norfolk County, while the eastern half became Princess Anne County. The latter was named for Anne Stuart prior to her accession to the throne in 1702.

Princess Anne County was governed by a Board of Supervisors. Each Supervisor represented one of six Magisterial Districts.

== American Revolutionary War ==
After the American colonies declared their independence in 1776, Loyalist opposition in various forms with different motives was present for the duration of the war. In Princess Anne and Norfolk Counties, organized criminals took advantage of the sudden power vacuum created in part by the ineffectiveness of the newly formed local authorities. Josiah Philips, a native of Princess Anne County, led one such group. His group used intimidation, the county's rough, swampy terrain, and disaffected local sympathizers to rob, kill, and terrorize the area for several years. After Philips' capture and subsequent escape, a writ of attainder, perhaps drafted by Thomas Jefferson, was passed by the Virginia General Assembly naming Philips and his followers in an effort to end what it described as an "insurrection" in the counties. Philips was tried and executed in June 1778.

== Virginia Beach Resort (late 19th century – 1963) ==
Beginning in the late 19th century, the small resort area of Virginia Beach along the Atlantic Ocean at the north eastern portion of the county's vast expanse of shoreline grew, particularly after 1888 with the arrival of rail service and electricity. It was incorporated as a town in 1906 and became an independent city on January 1, 1952, but Princess Anne (Courthouse) remained the county seat.

However, in the mid 20th century, the western borders of Princess Anne County lost territory to annexation suits by Norfolk, Virginia which adjoined it after annexing all of the northern portion of Norfolk County. A merger with the tiny city of Virginia Beach became seen as a way to prevent the independent City of Norfolk from annexing more (or potentially all) of Princess Anne County.

The original western border of Princess Anne County started in East Beach (present day Norfolk, Virginia) where 1st Bay Street meets the Chesapeake Bay. The county line traveled south down the inlet to Bi-County Road and continued between Moose Avenue and Buffalo Avenue, across East Little Creek Road, between the trailer park and Higby Street to meet North Military Highway. Follow North Military Highway south to Azalea Garden Road and Miller Store Road intersect. Travel southeast on Miller Store Road, to the end of Pritchard Street and follow the river under Interstate 64, to Cornick Road. From here simply follow the Broad Creek south.

== Consolidation with City of Virginia Beach (1963) ==
United States presidential election results for Princess Anne County, Virginia
Year	Republican		Democratic		Third party(ies)	
Year	No.	%	No.	%	No.	%
1880	604	40.29%	895	59.71%	0	0.00%
1884	971	49.62%	986	50.38%	0	0.00%
1888	1,004	54.15%	844	45.52%	6	0.32%
1892	409	37.73%	623	57.47%	52	4.80%
1896	687	46.26%	790	53.20%	8	0.54%
1900	327	30.50%	743	69.31%	2	0.19%
1904	109	20.53%	420	79.10%	2	0.38%
1908	99	19.30%	403	78.56%	11	2.14%
1912	40	7.62%	422	80.38%	63	12.00%
1916	67	11.49%	515	88.34%	1	0.17%
1920	105	14.64%	610	85.08%	2	0.28%
1924	137	15.97%	690	80.42%	31	3.61%
1928	1,040	55.29%	841	44.71%	0	0.00%
1932	432	22.71%	1,451	76.29%	19	1.00%
1936	436	18.41%	1,925	81.29%	7	0.30%
1940	445	20.82%	1,689	79.04%	3	0.14%
1944	993	33.63%	1,959	66.34%	1	0.03%
1948	1,329	35.77%	2,008	54.05%	378	10.17%
1952	3,180	51.04%	3,037	48.75%	13	0.21%
1956	4,675	50.52%	4,342	46.93%	236	2.55%
1960	4,844	44.67%	5,954	54.91%	45	0.42%

In 1963, after a successful referendum in both Virginia Beach and Princess Anne County, and with the approval of the Virginia General Assembly, Virginia Beach and Princess Anne County merged to form the present-day independent city of Virginia Beach. About the same time, Norfolk County merged with the small independent City of South Norfolk. The independent city that resulted from that merger, Chesapeake, became Virginia Beach's new neighbor to the southwest.

Most of the area formerly in the County of Princess Anne when it was formed in 1691 is now located within the independent City of Virginia Beach. The only exceptions are some territory of the northwestern portion which became part of the City of Norfolk through annexation and a land swap agreement between the two cities in 1988.

== Administrative divisions and sub-divisions ==
Magisterial District of Bayside

- Aragona, Virginia
- Bay Shore, Virginia
- Broad Creek, Virginia
- Davis Corner, Virginia
- Diamond Springs, Virginia
- East Beach, Virginia
- Little Creek, Virginia
- Lynnhaven
- Ocean Park, Virginia
- Pembroke Manor, Virginia
- Thalia

Magisterial District of Black Water

- Black Water, Virginia
- North Landing, Virginia
- Vine, Virginia

Magisterial District of Kempsville

- Bonney, Virginia
- Fairfield Manor, Virginia
- Kempsville
- Newtown
- Tallwood Manor, Virginia
- Wood Stock, Virginia
- Salem, Virginia Beach

Magisterial District of Lynnhaven

- Brock's Bridge, Virginia
- Cape Henry, Virginia
- Great Neck, Virginia
- Linkhorn Park, Virginia
- London Bridge
- Oceana
- Virginia Beach

Magisterial District of Pungo

- Back Bay
- Blossom Hill
- Capps, Virginia
- Creeds
- Land of Promise, Virginia
- Little Island
- Munden Point
- Pleasant Ridge
- Pungo
- Wash Woods

Magisterial District of Seaboard

- Dam Neck
- Land, Virginia (now Landstown)
- Mapleton (now Green Run)
- Princess Anne
- Sandbridge
- Seatack
- Sigma, Virginia

== See also ==
- History of Virginia Beach, Virginia
- Cape Henry, Virginia
- Seatack, Virginia
- Wash Woods, Virginia
- False Cape
