= Back Bay National Wildlife Refuge =

Wildlife reserve in Virginia, US

- IUCN category IV (habitat/species management area)
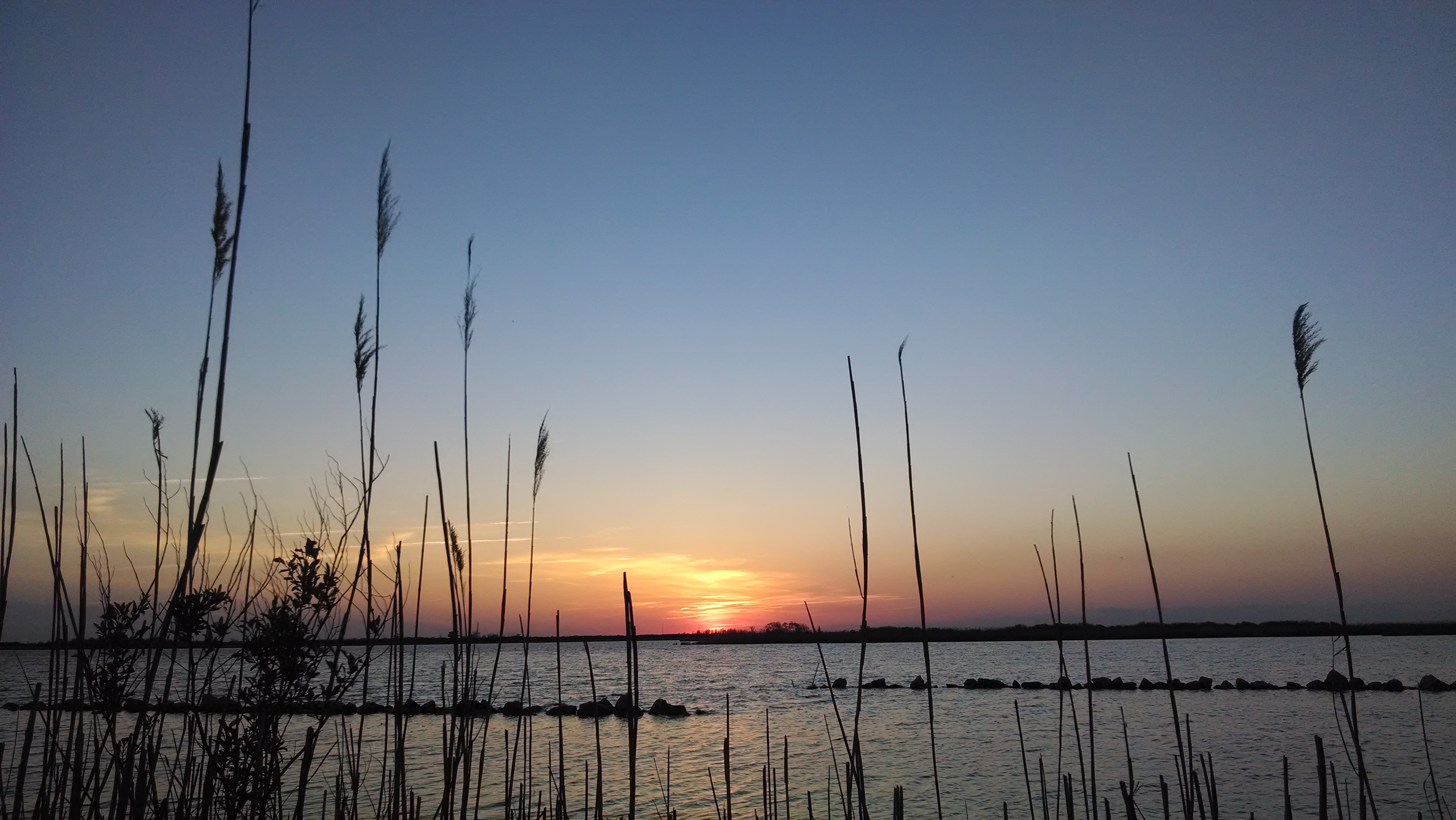
- Sunset over the Currituck Sound at Back Bay National Wildlife Refuge

- Location within Virginia Location within the United States
- Location: Virginia Beach, Virginia, United States
- Coordinates: 36°39′N 75°56′W
- Area: 9,062 acres (36.67 km^{2})
- Established: 1938
- Governing body: U.S. Fish and Wildlife Service
- Website: Back Bay National Wildlife Refuge

Back Bay National Wildlife Refuge in southeastern Virginia is located in the independent city of Virginia Beach. Established in 1938 in an isolated portion of the former Princess Anne County, it is managed by the U.S. Fish & Wildlife Service. The administrative office is located on Sandbridge Road at Sigma between Lago Mar and Sandbridge Beach. The Visitor Contact Center is accessed via Sandpiper Road from the Sandbridge area of Virginia Beach, which is the southernmost area of development on the Atlantic Coast of Virginia.

Most of the 9,062.45-acre (36.6744 km^{2}) freshwater refuge is on the Currituck Banks Peninsula, which borders the Atlantic Ocean on the east and the Back Bay of the Currituck Sound on the west. As part of Virginia's Outer Banks, the refuge's barrier islands feature large sand dunes, maritime forests, freshwater marshes, ponds, ocean beaches, and large impoundments for wintering wildfowl. The majority of refuge marshlands are on islands contained within the waters of Back Bay. It is considered by conservationists to be an important link along the Atlantic Flyway for migratory birds such as snow geese.

The refuge adjoins Virginia's False Cape State Park. Beyond that, the northern edge of North Carolina's Outer Banks lies immediately to the south. A tram runs through the refuge, providing the only public access to False Cape State Park other than by foot, bicycle, or boat. A bicycle/pedestrian trail is planned through the refuge between Sandbridge and Lago Mar.

== Gallery ==
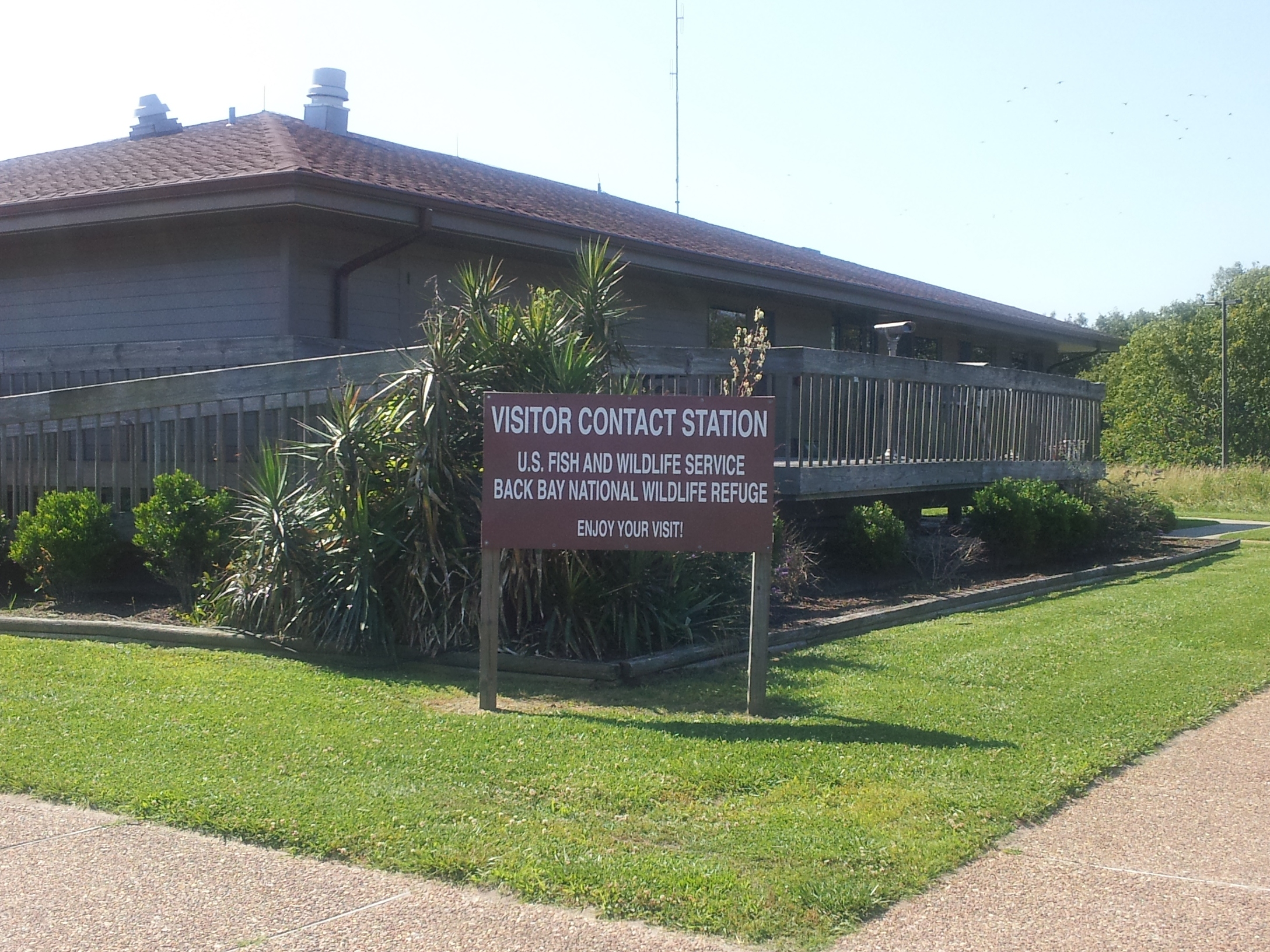
Back Bay NWR Visitor Contact Station

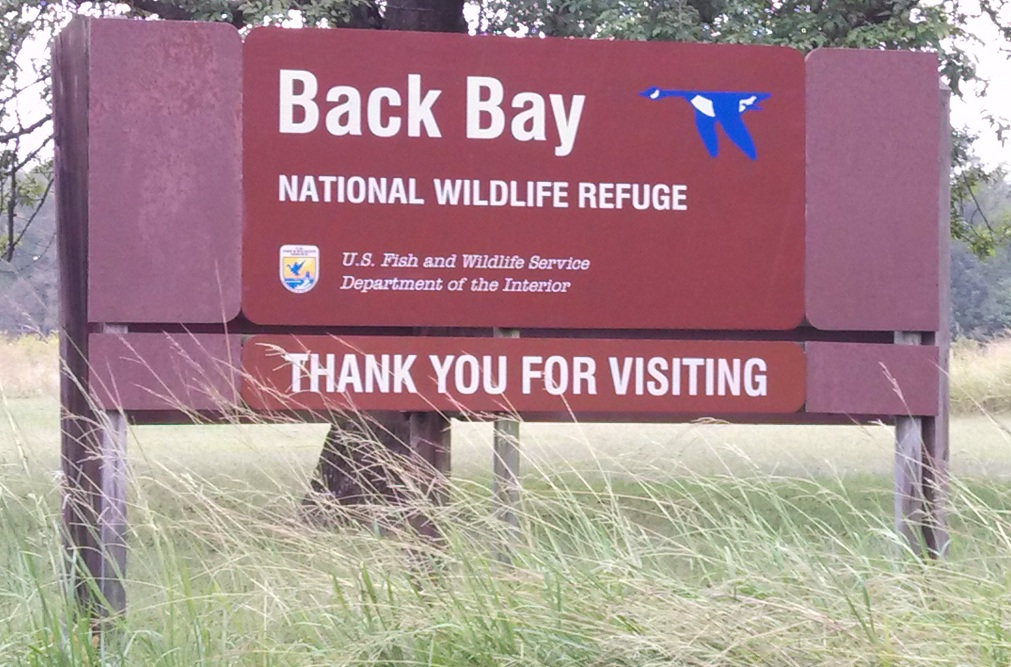
Back Bay NWR headquarters on Sandbridge Road near Sigma, VA

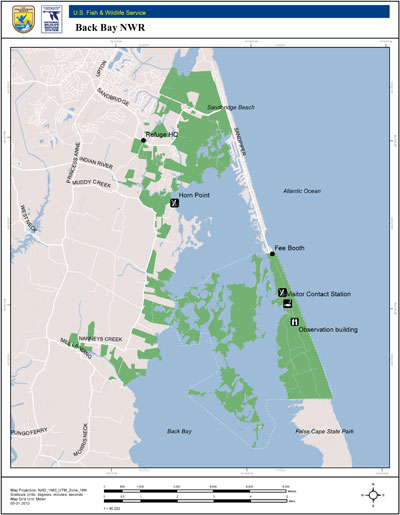
Back Bay NWR Map

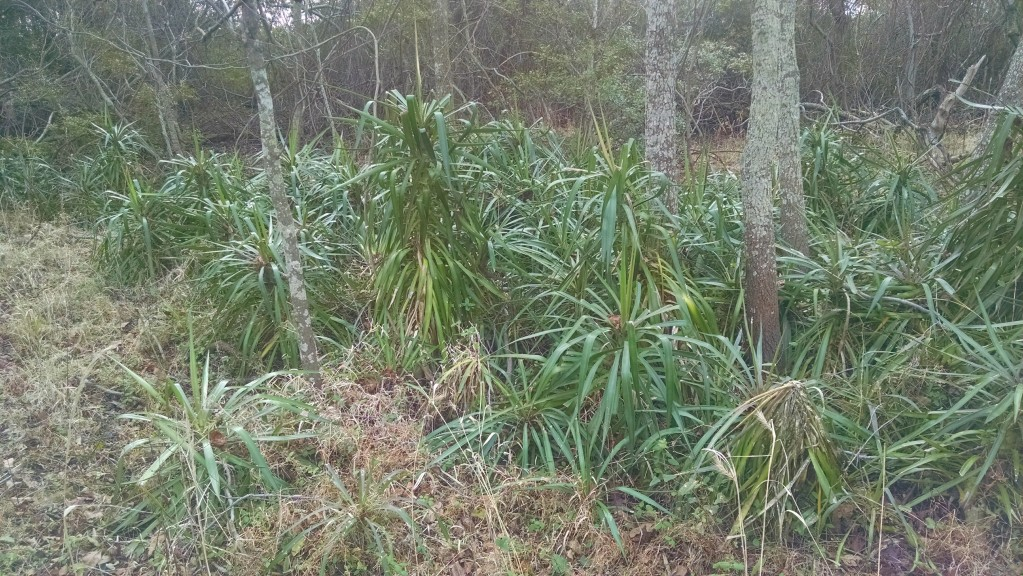
Perhaps the most northerly native stand of Yucca aloifolia, located in Back Bay National Wildlife Refuge.

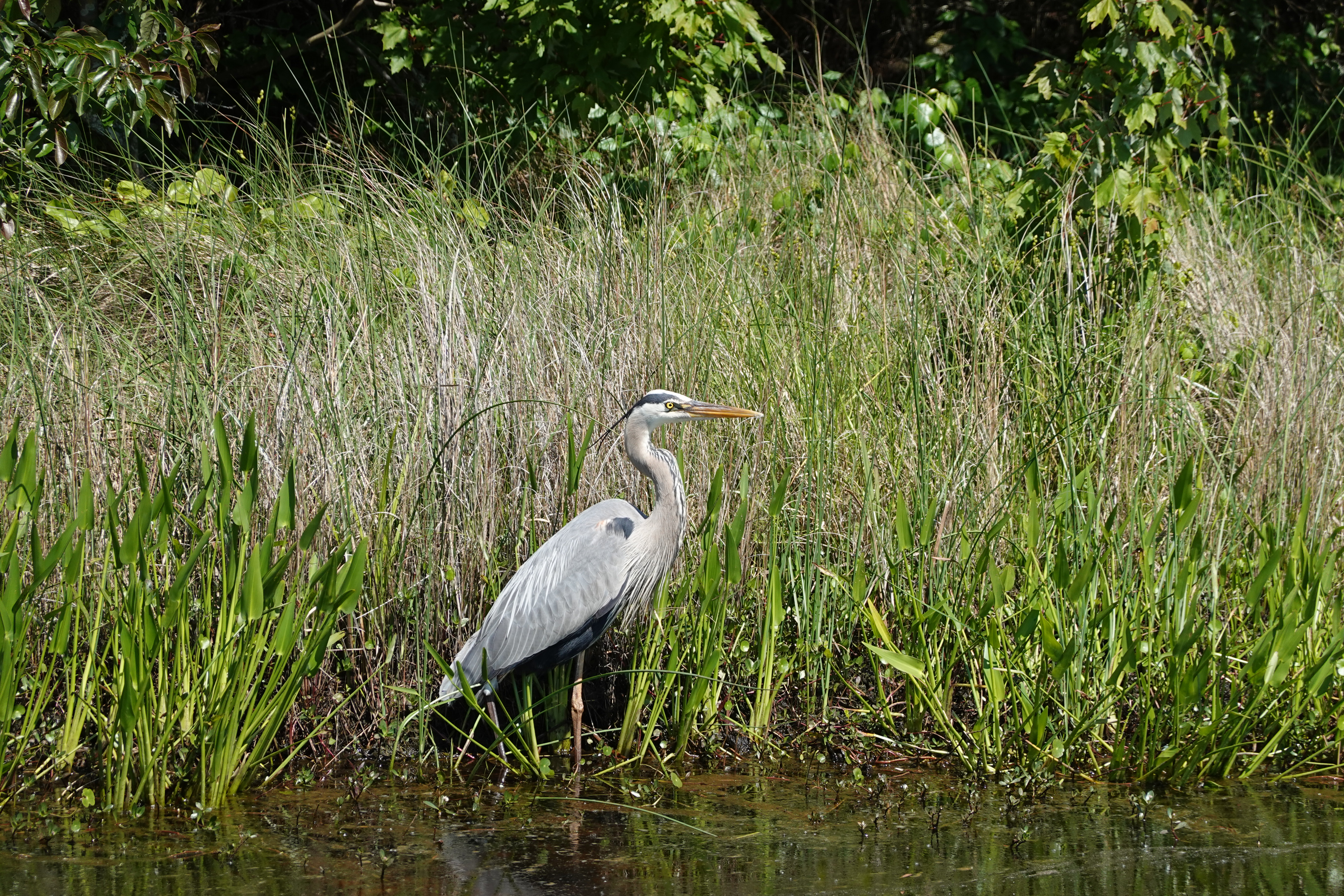
Heron in the Back Bay National Wildlife Refuge, 2021

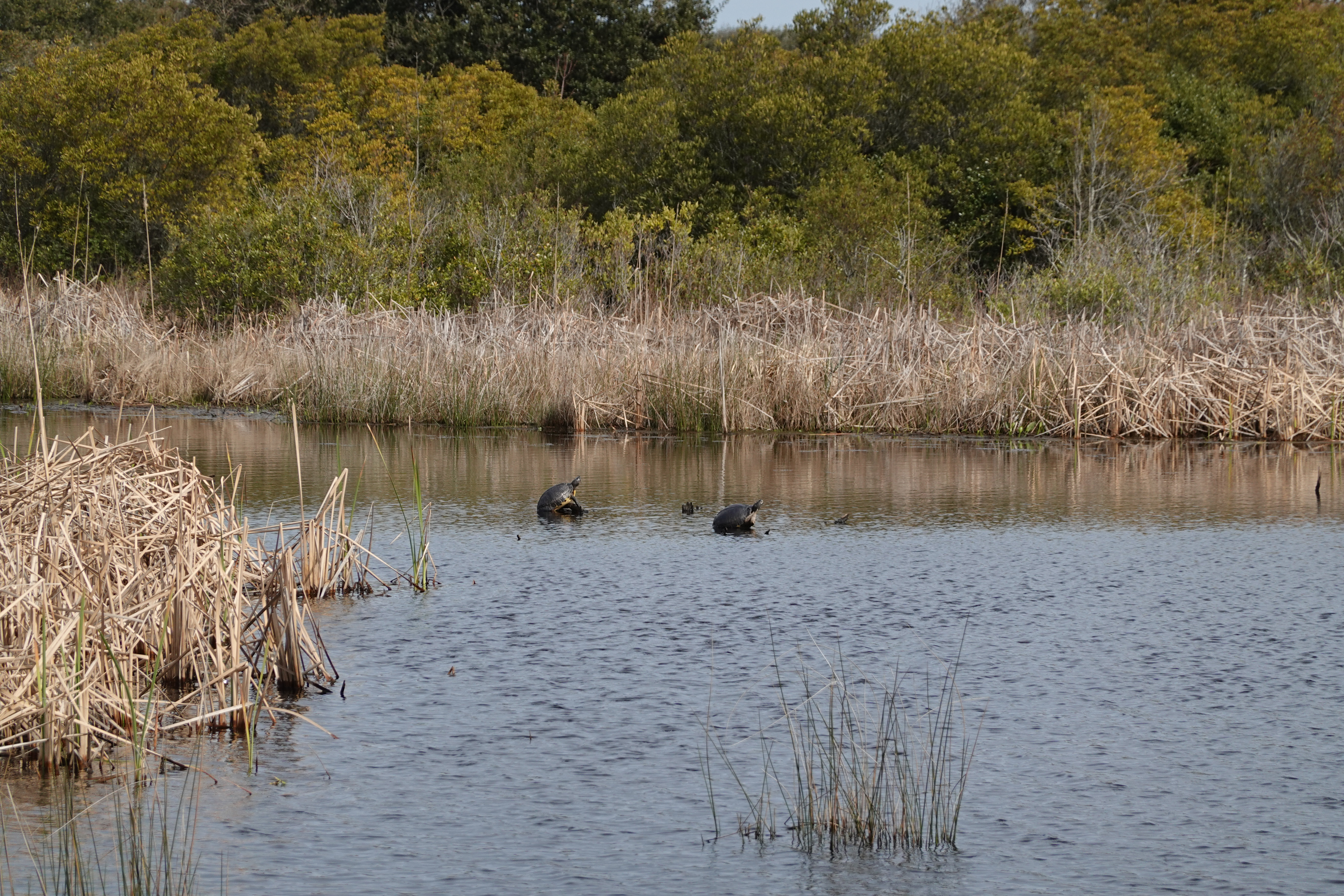
Turtles in the Back Bay National Wildlife Refuge, 2019

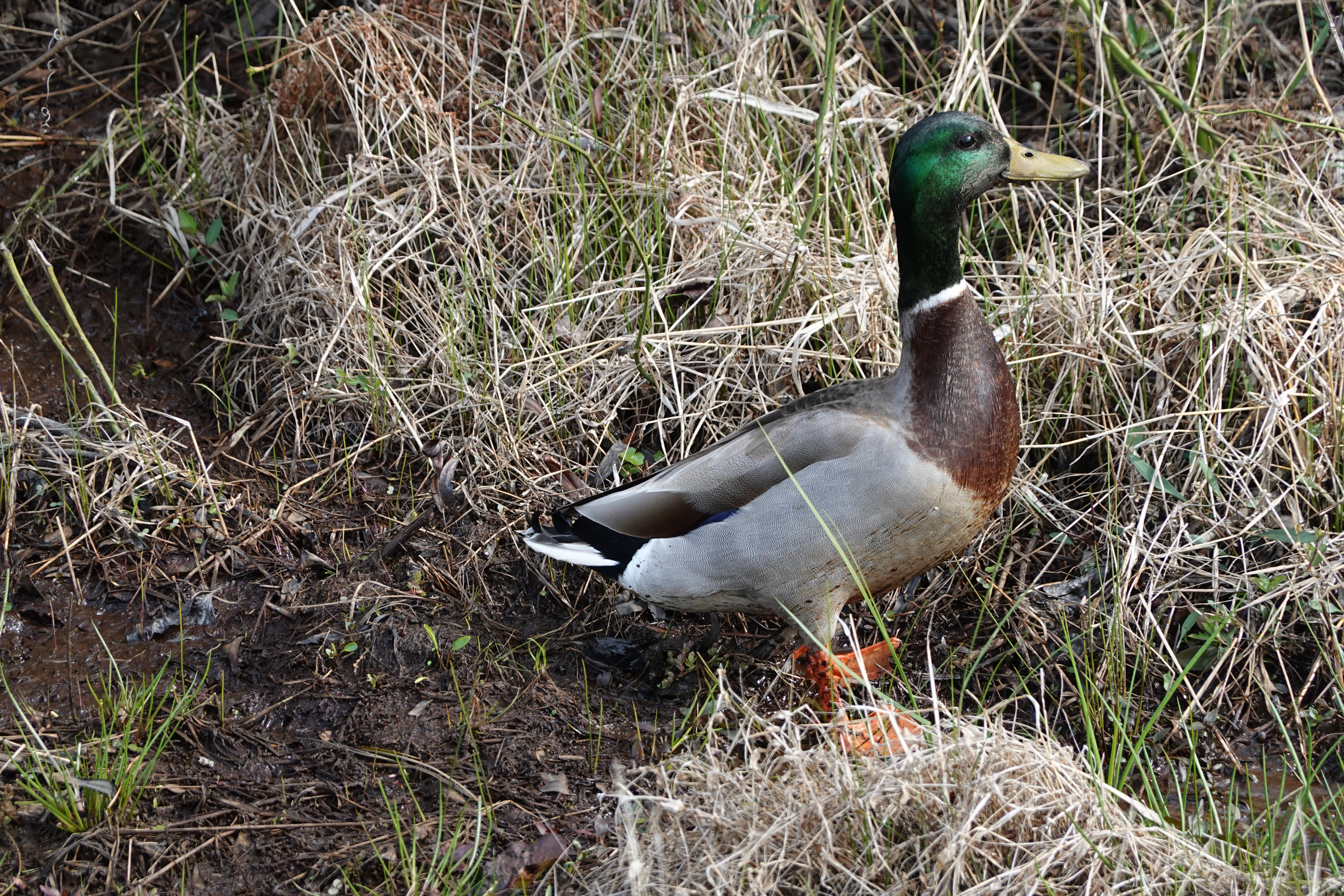
Back Bay National Wildlife Refuge, 2019
