= Bodie Island =

Peninsula in North Carolina, United States

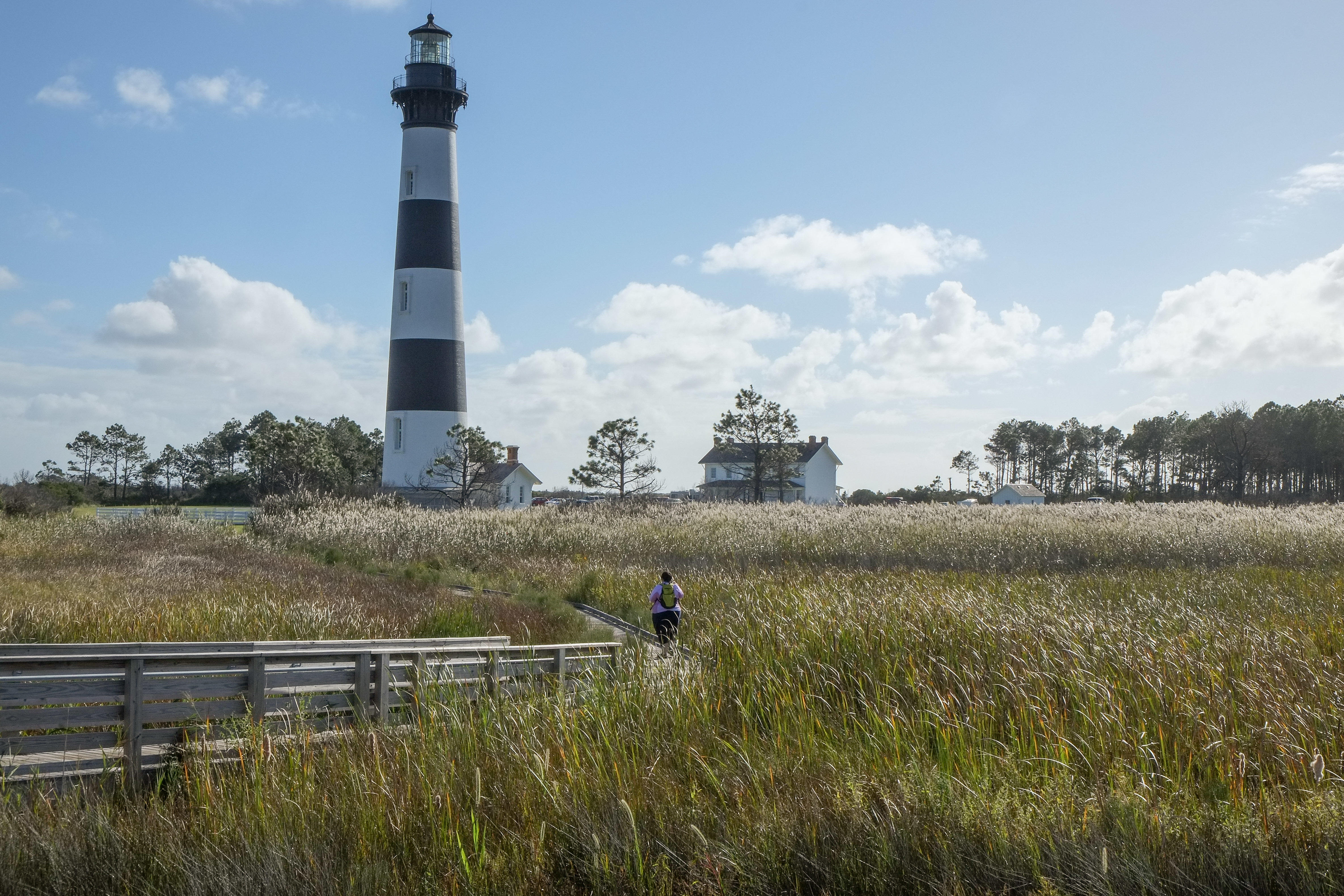

- Location within North Carolina

Geography
- Location: Outer Banks, North Carolina, United States
- Coordinates: 35°53′40″N 75°35′23″W
- Length: 115 km (71.5 mi)
- Width: 1.6 km (0.99 mi)

Bodie Island (/ˈbɒdi/ BAH-dee) is a long, narrow barrier peninsula that forms the northernmost portion of the Outer Banks. The land that is most commonly referred to as Bodie Island was at one time a true island, but in 1811 Roanoke Inlet, which had separated it from the Currituck Banks in the north, closed. As a result, the Currituck Banks and Bodie Island are now one contiguous peninsula, joined at the Nags Head area, where the inlet once flowed. Today, either name can refer to the peninsula as a whole, but both portions colloquially retain their historical names.

From the southern tip at Oregon Inlet, the peninsula stretches largely northwest out of North Carolina and into Virginia until terminating at Rudee Inlet at Owl Creek in Virginia Beach. At Sandbridge, Virginia Beach, Virginia, the peninsula is tied to the mainland by low tidal swamps and causeways road. The entire peninsula is approximately 72 miles in length, following the shoreline.

== Places of interest ==
The peninsula is home to two lighthouses, Bodie Island Light and Currituck Beach Light. The Wright Brothers National Monument also has a beacon and is found on the peninsula. Jockey's Ridge, the tallest sand dune on the East Coast, is found on the peninsula. The Cape Hatteras National Seashore protects the southernmost part of Bodie Island, and the Currituck National Wildlife Refuge, Back Bay National Wildlife Refuge and False Cape State Park protect portions of the northern part of the peninsula. "Tucked away between tall pine trees and freshwater marshland, the Bodie Island Light presents anything but a typical lighthouse setting. Though not as well-known as its neighbors, it remains an important part of local history and a favorite spot for visitors. And still, every evening, amidst the water towers and blinking radio antennae of modern development, its powerful light beams out across the darkening waves, keeping silent watch over the treacherous waters known as the “Graveyard of the Atlantic.” The lighthouse, now called Bodie Island Light Station and sporting a fresnel lens, remains standing and can be visited in the summer months.

== History ==
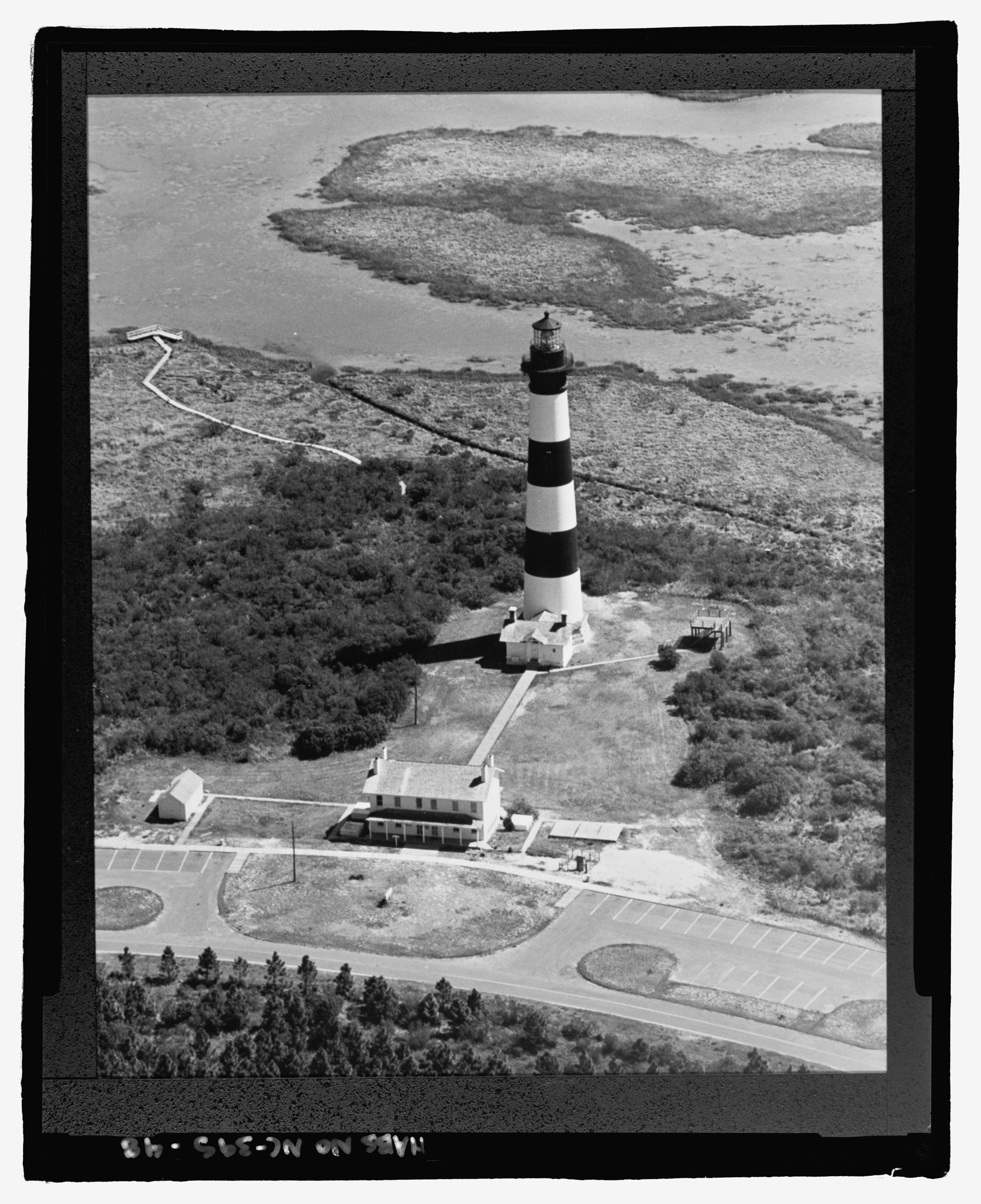
Bodie Island Light Station

Bodie Island was initially known as Bodie's Island or Body's Island and was named for a family of that name, variously written as "Body" "Boddye" "Boddy" and "Bodie" that settled there. Robert Boddy/Boddie emigrated to Virginia from London, England on August 10, 1635, on HMS Safety. He settled in Isle of Wight. Some of his descendants later settled in what later became North Carolina, South Carolina and Mississippi. (The Bodie Plantation, once one of the most extensive plantations in Mississippi, is now Tougaloo College, an HBCU (historically black colleges and universities).

Bodie Island was named after his descendants who settled in the area. The family was originally from Ingatestone, Essex, England which is where their coat of arms originated as well, with an augmentation by Elizabeth I to John Boddie for service during the naval battle with the Spanish Armada. At that time, three pelicans vulning themselves were added to their coat of arms. The heraldic pelican, one of the few female beasts in heraldry, is shown with a sharp stork-like beak, which it uses to vuln (pierce or wound) her breast. This is per the bestiary myth that a female pelican wounded herself thus to feed her chicks. This symbol of sacrifice carries a particular religious meaning (usually a reference to Christ's sacrifice). In reality, pelicans masticate food and then feed this bloody liquid from their beaks to their pelican chicks.

The Bodie family history is noted extensively in Seventeenth Century Isle of Wight County, Virginia Folklore sometimes attributes the naming of the island to the dead "bodies" of drowned sailors that washed up from the ships that ran aground and sank off the Outer Banks in what is now known as the Graveyard of the Atlantic but that is incorrect.

Inlets frequently open and close along the Outer Banks, making landform naming inconsistent. When it was an island, Bodie Island extended farther south than it does today. The island was initially formed around 1738, when New Inlet opened, separating Bodie Island from Hatteras Island to the south. The opening of Oregon Inlet in 1846 truncated the southern portion of Bodie Island, forming a new island situated between Bodie and Hatteras. The new barrier island was given the name Pea Island, but the wider, more powerful Oregon Inlet led to the eventual closure of New Inlet around 1933. Pea Island thus became a part of Hatteras Island until 2011 when New Inlet reopened during Hurricane Irene.

Near the North Carolina-Virginia state line, the Currituck Inlet and Musketo Inlets along with Caffey's Inlet to the south in the vicinity of Duck once existed, which made the Currituck Banks itself a chain of barrier islands. Currituck Inlet served as the boundary between the two states in the early 18th century. The old Currituck Inlet closed around 1728, Caffey's Inlet closed in 1811, New Currituck Inlet had closed by 1828 and Musketo Inlet finally closed in 1882 creating the long peninsula extending from Sandbridge to Oregon Inlet that is seen today.

Explorer John Lawson mentions Bodies Island just once in his 1709 book A New Voyage to Carolina, when discussing fauna of North Carolina, in particular, a species of rabbit. He wrote the following: "I was told of several that were upon Bodies Island by Ronoak, which came from that Ship of Bodies." This would indicate that Bodie Island was so named as early as 1709.

== Localities ==
The following is a list of places found on the peninsula, listed from south to north.

- Nags Head, North Carolina
- Kill Devil Hills, North Carolina
- Kitty Hawk, North Carolina
- Southern Shores, North Carolina
- Duck, North Carolina
- Corolla, North Carolina
- Carova Beach, North Carolina
- Sandbridge, Virginia

== Accessibility ==
Bodie Island can be accessed from North Carolina mainland from the Wright Memorial Bridge, originally built in 1966. It can also be accessed from U.S. Route 64 since the Washington Baum Bridge opened in 1994. Motorists driving north on the Outer Banks from Hatteras and Pea Islands reach the Currituck Banks on NC highway 12.

The north end of the peninsula is accessible by Sandpiper and Sandfiddler Roads via Sandbridge Road, but there is no highway connecting the Virginia portion of the Currituck Banks with the North Carolina portion, and even driving on the beach is no longer permitted north of the North Carolina border. Plans for an additional access point near Corolla which would be called the Mid-Currituck Bridge are currently on hold.
