= Red Mill Commons =

Shopping center in Virginia Beach, Virginia

Coordinates: 36°45′34″N 76°0′31″W

Red Mill Commons, opened in 2001, is a large regional shopping center located in southeast Virginia Beach, Virginia. It features some of the biggest names in retail including Home Depot, Super Wal-Mart, TJ Maxx, Target, OfficeMax and a unique mix of 80 other fine specialty stores, boutiques and restaurants.

Retailers at the site include: Walmart Supercenter, TJ Maxx, Home Depot, Michaels, Fat Frogs Bike & Fitness, Five Below, Dollar Tree, Home Depot, Petco, 17th Street Surf Shop, Crumbl Cookies, Bath & Body Works, ABC and others; restaurants include: Outback Steakhouse, Chili's, Buffalo Wild Wings, Sonic Drive In, Wendy's, Five Guys, Starbucks, Panera Bread, La Bella Italia, Señor Fox Mexican Restaurant, Rigolettos, Taco Bell, Tapped Crafthouse, Tida Thai, Flip Flops Grill + Chill, Domoishi, Zero's Subs, Cold Stone Creamery, Red Robin, and Chipotle Mexican Grill.

In early 2008, Red Mill Walk, an expansion of the complex that is anchored by a Target, opened across Elson Green Ave. It also contains an OfficeMax store, Primo Pizza, Pearle Vision, AT&T, Once Upon a Child and several other businesses. "Red Mill Landing" was built soon after and includes Fire Brew restaurant, Linxx Martial Arts Academy, The Skinny Dip Frozen Yogurt Bar and a Sprint store.

Red Mill Commons contains 775,000 and Red Mill Walk 240,000 square feet (22,000 m^{2}) of retail space.
