= Sandbridge, Virginia =

Sandbridge
- Neighborhood
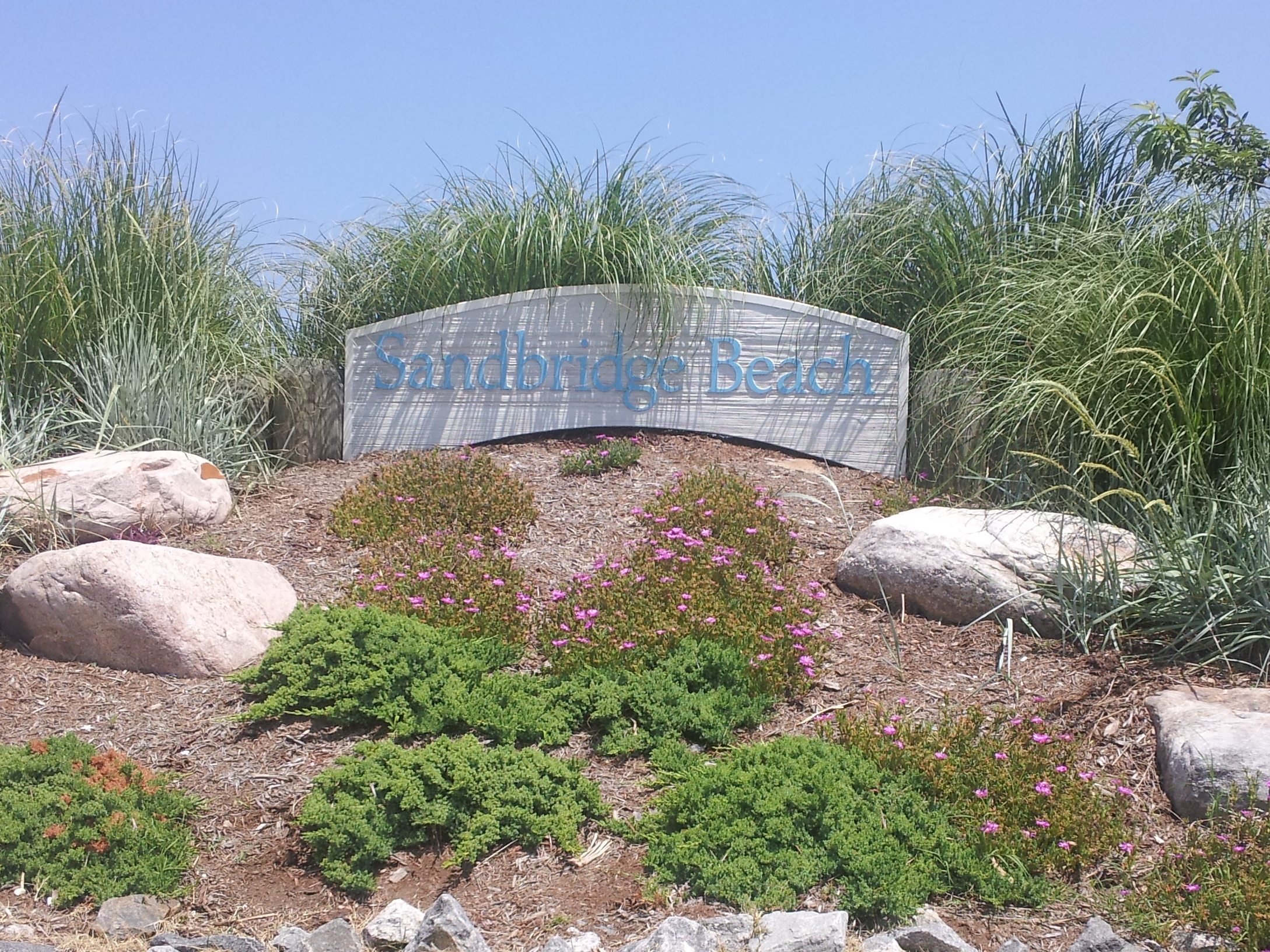
- Entrance to Sandbridge Beach

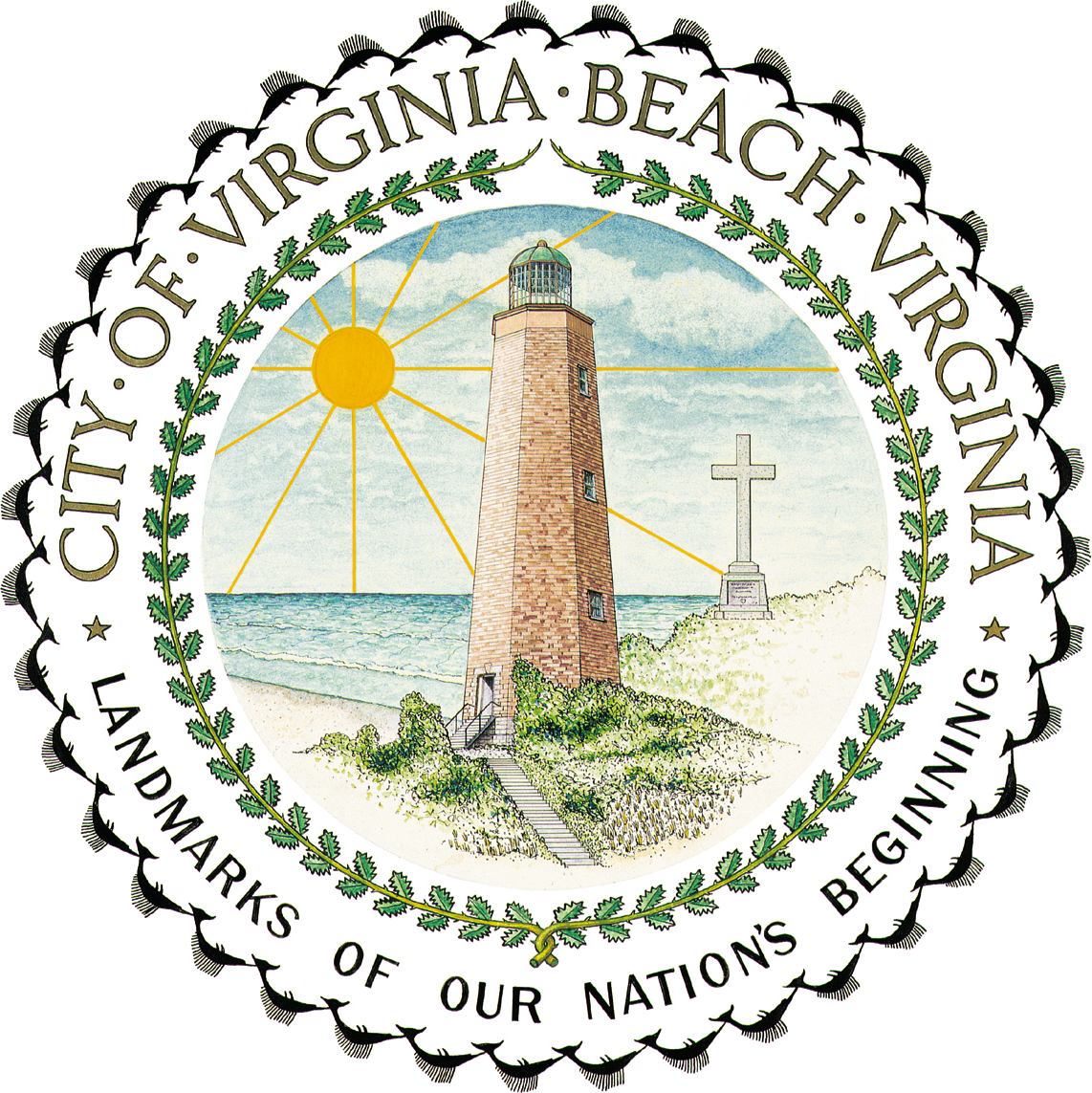
- Seal
- Nickname: "Virginia's Outer Banks"
- Location within the Commonwealth of Virginia Sandbridge (the United States)
- Coordinates: 36°44′46″N 75°56′39″W
- Country: United States
- Elevation: 10 ft (3.0 m)

Population
  - Estimate (2010): 405
- Time zone: UTC−5 (Eastern (EST))
  - Summer (DST): UTC−4 (EDT)
- ZIP code: 23456
- Area codes: 757, 948

Sandbridge, in the U.S. state of Virginia, is a coastal community of Virginia Beach, located along the coastline on the Currituck Banks Peninsula at the northern end of the Outer Banks. The Atlantic Ocean is to the east, the Back Bay of the Currituck Sound is to the west, and the Back Bay National Wildlife Refuge and False Cape State Park lie to the south. To the north, Sandbridge borders the U.S. Navy's Dam Neck facility. Located near the southern end of Sandbridge is Little Island Park, which is managed by the City of Virginia Beach. Sandbridge Beach runs approximately 4.5 miles (7.2 kilometres) from north to south along the oceanfront.

The only public road entrance to the community is Sandbridge Road, which is near the northern end of Sandbridge and connects it to businesses and neighborhoods in the Princess Anne area of Virginia Beach. Local residents used to have the privilege of driving through the adjacent Dam Neck Naval installation (with permit) to shorten their commute. A special guard was posted on the south entrance of the base to admit or deny travelers. However, in the post-9/11 atmosphere the "back-gate" has been closed down for security purposes. By the year 2025, the city of Virginia Beach plans to complete an extension of Nimmo Parkway, which would cut the drive from Sandbridge to its nearest neighbors in Lago Mar by half. This would also be a much more convenient connection to the shopping and dining centers at Red Mill, Courthouse and beyond. Multipurpose Nimmo Trail would also be extended adjacent to the new road, making Sandbridge accessible by foot and bicycle.

Sandbridge is known for its somewhat remote location and receives a smaller volume of visitors than the main Virginia Beach resort strip located a few miles to its north. The Virginia Beach EMS Lifeguard Division does protect the water in Sandbridge. They hold four stands at Market Place Beach and ten stands at Little Island Beach. There are four supervising lifeguards who keep constant patrol over the rest of the waters where lifeguards are not permanently stationed. Lifeguards are on duty daily from 9:30 a.m. to 6:00 p.m., Memorial Day weekend to Labor Day.

Sandbridge consists primarily of single family homes. There are also four condominium complexes, the largest of which are Sanctuary at False Cape, at the south end near the Back Bay National Wildlife Refuge, and Sandbridge Dunes, at the north end. Many of the residential properties are available for rent on daily, weekly, or monthly basis. The ratio of year-round residents to renters is said to be about 1:5. Through the mid-1990s several homes were lost to the Atlantic, but sand replenishment efforts have been successful in restoring the beach. At one time it was not uncommon to see a Banker Horse which had roamed too far north. The horses were known to cause problems eating vegetation from yards, and occasionally were struck by vehicles. More fences were built south of the Virginia/North Carolina border to help curb this problem in recent years.

Former Major League Baseball third baseman Ryan Zimmerman grew up in Sandbridge, and currently owns a vacation home there. Former Virginia governor Bob McDonnell owned two properties in Sandbridge.

== Weather ==
Sandbridge has a humid subtropical climate (Cfa) with long, hot summers and short, cool winters. Precipitation peaks during summer due to thunderstorm activity. Snowfall is rare.

The Outer Banks has unusual weather patterns due to its unique geographical location. As the Currituck Banks Peninsula juts out from the eastern seaboard into the Atlantic, Sandbridge has a predisposition to be affected by hurricanes, Nor'easters (usually in the form of rain, and rarely snow or mixed precipitation), and other ocean-driven storms.

The winters are typically milder than in inland areas, with January lows averaging 34–36 °F (1–2 °C) and highs of 50–53 °F (10–12 °C), and is more frequently overcast than in the summer. However, the exposure of the Outer Banks makes it prone to higher winds, often causing wind chills to make the apparent temperature as cold as the inland areas. Although snow is possible, averaging 3 inches (76 mm) annually, there are many times when years pass between snowfalls.

The summer months average from lows of 70–76 °F (21–24 °C) to highs of 87–89 °F (31–32 °C), with water temperatures rising from 70 °F (21 °C) to around 80 °F (27 °C) by August. The spring and fall are typically milder seasons. The fall and winter are usually warmer than areas inland, while the spring and the summer are often slightly cooler due to the moderating effects of being surrounded by water.

Climate data for Sandbridge, Virginia Beach, VA (1981-2010)
Month	Jan	Feb	Mar	Apr	May	Jun	Jul	Aug	Sep	Oct	Nov	Dec	Year
Mean daily maximum °F (°C)	52 (11)	54 (12)	60 (16)	68 (20)	77 (25)	84 (29)	88 (31)	86 (30)	82 (28)	73 (23)	63 (17)	57 (14)	70 (21)
Mean daily minimum °F (°C)	35 (2)	37 (3)	42 (6)	52 (11)	61 (16)	69 (21)	73 (23)	73 (23)	69 (21)	59 (15)	48 (9)	40 (4)	55 (13)
Average precipitation inches (mm)	4.43 (112.522)	4.20 (106.68)	4.19 (106.426)	3.72 (94.488)	3.55 (90.17)	4.49 (114.046)	5.61 (142.494)	6.55 (166.37)	4.85 (123.19)	4.29 (108.966)	3.37 (85.598)	3.76 (95.504)	53.01 (1,346.454)
Average snowfall inches (mm)	1.27 (32.258)	1.17 (29.718)	0.21 (5.334)	0.0 (0.0)	0.0 (0.0)	0.0 (0.0)	0.0 (0.0)	0.0 (0.0)	0.0 (0.0)	0.0 (0.0)	0.02 (.508)	0.26 (6.604)	2.93 (74.422)
Source: Sandbridge Weather

Climate data for Sandbridge, VA Ocean Water Temperature (11 S Virginia Beach)
Month	Jan	Feb	Mar	Apr	May	Jun	Jul	Aug	Sep	Oct	Nov	Dec	Year
Daily mean °F (°C)	55 (13)	53 (12)	48 (9)	52 (11)	59 (15)	72 (22)	77 (25)	81 (27)	74 (23)	69 (21)	60 (16)	60 (16)	63 (17)
Source: NOAA

== Sandbridge beach ==
Sandbridge Beach (36°44′46″N 75°56′39″W) is in the southern part of the city of Virginia Beach. The beach is about 4.5 miles (7.2 kilometres) in length, north to south. Its location is like that of the Outer Banks of North Carolina, with the Back Bay of the Currituck Sound to the west and the Atlantic Ocean to the east. Because of this, it is often referred to as "The Outer Banks of Virginia". Similar to North Carolina's Outer Banks, Sandbridge Beach is occasionally prone to tropical storms, which can result in mandatory evacuations.

There are no hotels at this beach, but houses and condos may be rented, and the area is a well-frequented tourist spot. One of the biggest attractions to Sandbridge is its relative remoteness when compared to the Virginia Beach oceanfront. Low speed, two-lane Sandbridge Road provides the only automobile access. Located at the south end of the beach is Little Island city park, which is the location of Sandbridge Pier.

Preceded by Northernmost point	Beaches of The Outer Banks	Succeeded by False Cape
