= Dominion District =

The Dominion District includes public schools from the Greater Richmond Region in the U.S. state of Virginia. Dominion District schools compete in Class 6, Class 5, and Class 4 based on school enrollment. District schools are located in the central part of the Greater Richmond Region south of the James River, which includes schools in Chesterfield County, Richmond City, and Powhatan County.

== Member schools ==
As of 2026, the ten schools in the district(7 from Chesterfield County, 2 from Richmond City, and 1 from Powhatan) are:

- Lloyd C. Bird High School of Chesterfield
- Clover Hill High School of Midlothian
- Cosby High School of Midlothian
- Huguenot High School of Richmond
- James River High School of Midlothian
- Manchester High School of Midlothian
- Midlothian High School of Midlothian
- Monacan High School of North Chesterfield
- Powhatan High School of Powhatan.
- Richmond High School for the Arts of Richmond
