= Slash Coleman =

American dramatist

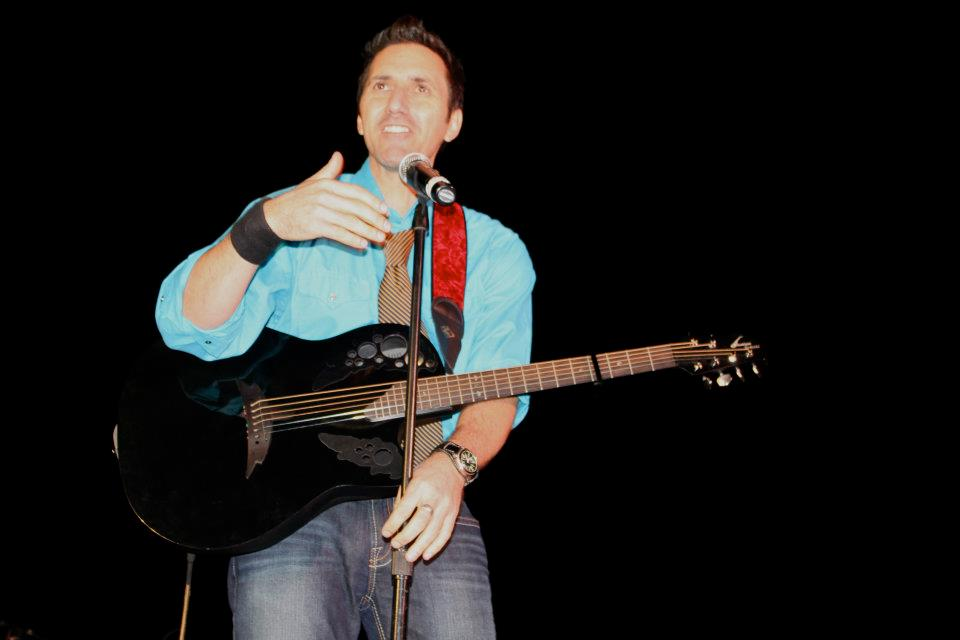
- Coleman in 2011
- Born: Jeffrey Mark Coleman; August 13, 1967 (age 59); Richmond, Virginia
- Occupations: Storyteller, writer, producer
- Website: http://www.slashcoleman.com/

Slash Coleman (born August 13, 1967) is an American storyteller, producer, and writer who lives in Richmond, Virginia. The author of The Bohemian Love Diaries, a personal perspectives blogger for Psychology Today, and a laughter yoga teacher, he is best known for his one-man performance-based storytelling shows which combine clever wordplay, music, and poetic observations about family, spirituality, romantic relationships, and struggles to find a sense of home common with Generation X artists. His work is often compared to that of author David Sedaris.

== Personal life ==
Coleman was born Jeffrey Mark Coleman in Richmond, Virginia and raised in Chesterfield, Virginia. He is a first-generation American and a third generation artist descended from a grandfather who was a dancer at the Moulin Rouge and a father, Mike Coleman, who is a prolific sculptor. His mother, Nicole, is a Holocaust survivor who was born in France. He legally changed his first name to Slashtipher with his barmitzva money to illuminate his Jewish past and to honor his grandparents who worked for the French Resistance during the war.

Coleman spent his formative years in his father's art studio learning to draw and paint. He began playing the piano at the age of five and took up the alto saxophone at L.C. Bird High School. Throughout his teens, he played in various alternative rock bands and went on to study jazz piano and creative writing at Radford University in Virginia, Middlesex University in London, and at Columbia College in Chicago where he received his master's degree. He went on to earn a degree at East-West College of the Healing Arts and furthered his studies at the Upledger Institute and Oregon College of Oriental Medicine.

== Television ==
Coleman produced, wrote and starred in a PBS Special in 2008 entitled The Neon Man and Me which is a tribute to his best friend, Mark Jamison, a neon artist from Roanoke, Virginia who was electrocuted while hanging a neon sign. A month after Jamison died, his girlfriend discovered she was pregnant. Coleman and Jamison met at Radford University while in a jazz ensemble called Vegetation Information.

The show, which seeks to illuminate a young man's challenge with his sense of place in the world after his best friend's death, included 7 monologues about friendship and an original music score. Underwritten by The Association for Death Education and Counseling and the Wilbert Foundation, the program was distributed by (NETA) The National Education Television Alliance in 2010 and aired on PBS station nationwide until 2012. Paul Tait Roberts was the senior producer and John Felton was the executive co-producer. The story behind The Neon Man and Me was recorded for StoryCorps and included in the archives at the Smithsonian.

== Performance history ==
=== 2000–02 ===
Coleman lived in Portland, OR from 1997–2001. There, he worked primarily as massage therapist and a visual artist, selling his paintings at the Portland Saturday Market and through galleries. He began hosting Home Grown Theatre out of his southeast Portland apartment. The venue showcased new work from Portland performers, musicians and filmmakers and the characters in Coleman's own performance art that would eventually become a foundation of his stage work. In 2000, he formed the production company About Vision Entertainment, with Stash Tea CEO Tom Lisicki, which produced over a dozen multidisciplinary products including a line of drinking teas and educational products for the Charkas.

=== 2003–05 ===
Coleman moved to Northampton, MA in 2003 and produced his first solo show "Love in Boxes," at the Northampton Center for the Arts on February 14, 2004. Coleman portrayed 6 characters in the production which chronicled a young boy named Jeffrey Rabbit who practiced a peculiar courtship ritual that involved giving women unusual cardboard boxes while struggling with his attempts at love and his anxieties about rejection. The set included hundreds of cardboard boxes. The national tour included theatres in Portland, OR, Seattle, WA, Portland, ME, and Richmond, VA.

=== 2005–06 ===
In 2005, the death of Coleman's best friend prompted his return to his hometown of Richmond, Virginia. There he created his solo show, The Neon Man and Me, as a tribute to his best friend, Mark Jamison, a neon artist from Roanoke, Virginia, known as the "Neon Man". The show opened at Mill Mountain Theatre in Roanoke, on October 9, 2005 and ran for three weeks. It was produced by an anonymous patron. The Neon Man and Me began to tour through regional art galleries, churches, synagogues, colleges, and public schools before running on the International Fringe Theatre Festival circuit, where it opened at the San Francisco Fringe Festival in September 2005 in San Francisco, California. Subsequent fringe festival venues included: Washington, DC; Boulder, CO; Minneapolis, MN; Long Island, NY; and Provincetown, MA. Coleman donated 100% of ticket sales either back to the Jamison family, host venues or charities and helped raise nearly $100,000 for non-profits including children's hospitals, bereavement organizations, and schools.

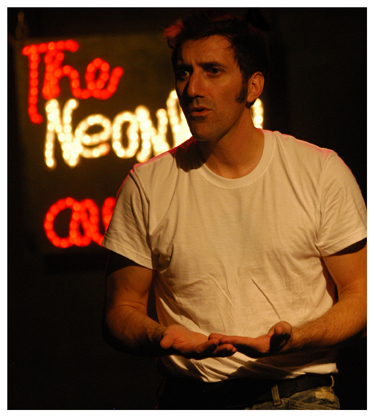
Neon Man on opening night at Mill Mountain Theatre

In 2006, PBS/WCVE-TV expressed interest in filming The Neon Man and Me, pending Coleman's ability to raise the necessary production funding. With the help of a student filmmaker he met on Craigslist, Coleman created a documentary entitled Glow, and began a subsequent grassroots living room tour, traveling throughout Virginia homes for the next two years and taking donations until all $65,000 of the budget was raised.

In 2006, with funding from the National Endowment for the Arts, Coleman created a public school curriculum entitled "Healing Community: Helping Students Come to Terms with Tragedy, Loss, and Violence." He based the curriculum on the model he used to create The Neon Man and Me, then with a series of artist residencies through the Virginia Commission for the Arts, he began teaching the curriculum within the Richmond Public School system. In observance of Governor Kaine's Month of the Grieving Child, Coleman produced a tour of student monologues relating to friendship and loss that was performed at the Virginia Museum of Fine Arts.

In conjunction with his solo performance work, Coleman began to collaborate with other Richmond performers and directors in the summer of 2006. Over the next four years, he created over a half dozen burlesque shows, first with Nouvelle Burlesque and then with his own performance troupe, The Modern Burlesque Brigade. These included: Ballad of the Beautiful Sex Monster, Sex Education and The Death Match of Love. Emphasizing vaudeville, physical comedy, modern dance, and live jazz, Coleman is credited as a writer/producer/performer with helping re-introduce burlesque back into the Richmond entertainment scene for the first time since 1978.

=== 2007–08 ===
By 2007, media coverage of "The Neon Man and Me," had appeared in The New York Times, The Washington Post, American Theatre Magazine and Backstage Magazine. In the spring of 2007, "The Neon Man and Me," ran Off-Broadway at Teatro La Tea in New York, NY. Later that year, Samson Trinh (composer/saxophonist) took over as musical director and a jazz trio known as The Neon Man Band began to accompany Coleman on his tour.

Later in 2007, Coleman began to explore unresolved personal themes within "The Neon Man and Me," mainly around issues about identity and those regarding his family and their experience with the Holocaust. He created a solo show that revealed his own connection to this profound material. "Slash Coleman has Big Matzo Balls." opened in Washington DC at the Warehouse Theater on July 24, 2008 and was again performed at the International Holocaust Exhibit in Richmond, VA.

In 2008, Coleman also began to publish articles and teach classes on marketing for artists which were included in the NPR series "How Artists Make Money.". Then, under the pseudonym, "Mr. Fringey." he began collecting an extensive list of resources including reviews of fringe festivals for fellow fringe festival theatre performers which he shared on his blog called "Fringe or Die."

=== 2009–10 ===
In 2009, Coleman was invited to perform at the National Storytelling Festival in Jonesborough, TN at which time Susan O'Connor, director of programs declared herself, "a real fan," of his work. Afterward, Coleman rebranded himself as a professional storyteller and began to perform exclusively on the National Storytelling Circuit.

"Chaidentity" opened on July 9, 2010 at the Goethe Institut in Washington DC and was later performed at the National Storytelling Conference.

By the end of 2010, Coleman had been invited to perform at: The Oral History Performance Conference at Columbia University, The LA Storytelling Festival, The League for the Advancement of New England Storytelling and Stonesoup Storytelling Festival.

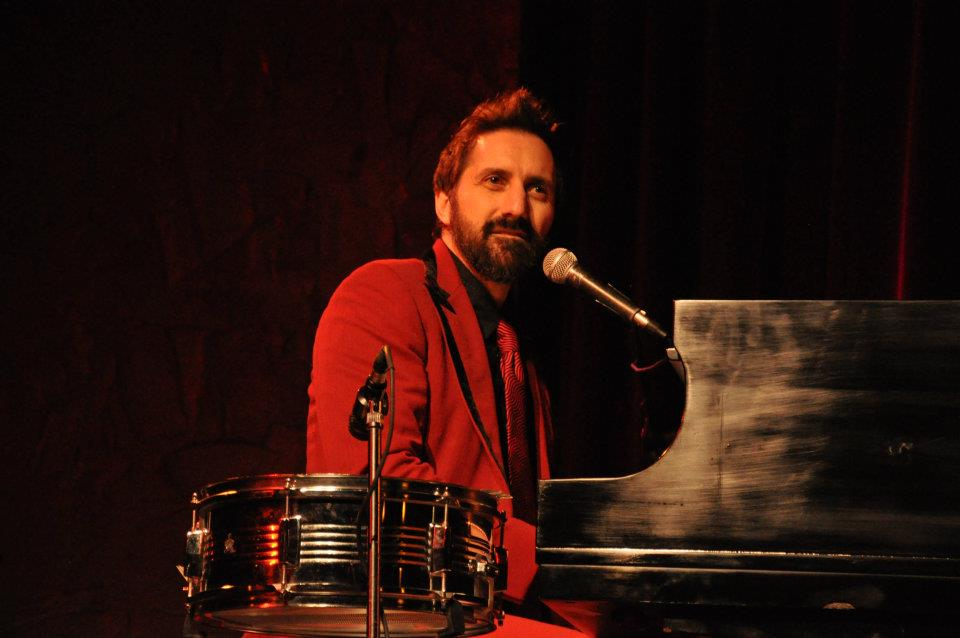
Valentine's Day Performance 2012 at Portland Story Theater.

=== 2010–11 ===
In 2011, Coleman's work gained a wider audience. Coleman was invited to participate in two artist residencies:The International Storytelling Center and Portland Story Theater. He was also invited to perform at Pete Seeger's Clearwater Festival, The Timpanogos Storytelling Conference, and Gimistory International Storytelling Festival in the Cayman Islands.

Award-winning novelist Eliezer Sobel joined Coleman on stage for a duo version of "Chaidentity" which included a tour through synagogues in the mid-atlantic region. Both performers explained what it was like to grow up with mothers who are Holocaust survivors.

=== 2011–12 ===
In 2012, Coleman signed with Jean V. Naggar agency and moved to New York City to begin work on his second PBS special about the rebirth of storytelling in the United States. He became a regular personal perspectives blog contributor at Psychology Today where his posts appear under the title, "The Bohemian Love Diaries." In February, Coleman's solo show "Big Plastic Heroes: The Last American Gladiator," opened in Portland, OR at The Sanctuary and then moved to an Off-Off Broadway venue in New York City at UNDER St. Marks. The production details Coleman's childhood obsession with Evel Knievel and illuminates his colorful past. In November, Coleman performed "The Neon Man and Me," at the highly acclaimed Theatre Row in the heart of the New York City theatre district on 42nd Street for one night. The sold out production received the 2012 award for Best Drama by United Solo Theatre Festival. Current solo work now includes elements of theatre, storytelling and the incorporation of his skills as a pianist and guitarist.

=== 2012–13 ===
Coleman was invited to give a TED (conference)Talk at Tedx MillRiver on the creative process. Entitled, "A Moment in Rice," the talk chronicled Coleman's experience with the creative impulse. Later that year, he was invited to become a resident artist at Horse Trade Theatre Company and launched a live daytime television talk show for artists called "Slash Wednesday," at UNDER St. Marks Theatre.

In 2013, Coleman’s memoir “The Bohemian Love Diaries” was published by Lyon’s Press and released later that year in Italy by Newton Compton under the title “L'amore ha la febbre alta.” The stories from the book were crafted using the oral tradition and were first told on the National Storytelling Festival circuit.

The stage version of the book was presented at the 4th Annual United Solo Theater Festival at Theatre ROW and the following year the book was named a finalist for the 17th Annual People’s Choice Award for non-fiction by the Library of Virginia.

=== 2013–17 ===
During his book tour, Coleman was admitted to the emergency room for a medical condition known as a Primary Spontaneous Pneumothorax; a collapsed lung. After a month in the hospital and three surgeries, he moved home to Richmond, Virginia.

The Chesterfield Education Foundation recognized Coleman as an outstanding alumni of Chesterfield County Public Schools and presented him with a Bravo! Award at the Seventh Annual Bravo Awards gala in 2016.

=== 2017–19 ===
On the advice of his surgeon, who mentioned that laughing might help heal his lung, Coleman participated in a laughter yoga session and found the interactive games, collective exercises and frequent eye contact helped him feel more connected, less alone and greatly improved his health.

In 2018, Coleman received his certification as a Laughter Yoga Leader from Laughter Yoga University and began a yearlong laughter experiment. During the year, in addition to providing free laughter yoga sessions to over 9,000 members of his community, he hosted laughter flash mobs, a form of Jharokha Darshan called Laughing Darshan in busy storefront windows (in which strangers were invited to sit across from him and laugh), and warmed-up audiences with laughter yoga exercises before theatrical events.

During this time, laughter yoga programs were established at Hunter Holmes McGuire Veterans Administration Medical Center and ASK Childhood Cancer Foundation. In addition, he began to speak as a keynote presenter on the benefits of laughter and its positive effect on the body.

In 2019, Coleman was contacted by Dr. Madan Kataria, the founder of Laughter Yoga University. He travelled to Bangalore, India to study with the doctor in addition to being presented with the US Laughter Ambassador Award.

Upon his return, Coleman founded Laughter Yoga Richmond and in conjunction with the Virginia Commonwealth University School of Medicine began to study the effects of laughter yoga on those suffering from alcoholism and drug-addiction. The preliminary studies explore how variables such as optimism and joy are effected by purposeful laughter yoga exercises and how those changes may affect the neuroplasticity of the brain.

== Writing ==
Books

- The Bohemian Love Diaries (Lyons Press, 2013) ISBN 978-0762786985
- L'amore ha la febbre alta (Newton Compton, 2013) ISBN 978-8854157750
- Is My Chakra Pretty? (About Vision, 2004) ISBN 978-1594572234

Anthologies

- Circle of the 9 Muses: A Storytelling Field Guide for Innovators and Meaning Makers w/ David Hutchens (Wiley (publisher), 2015) ISBN 978-1118973967
- Book Lovers: Sexy Stories from Under the Covers w/ Shawna Kenney (Seal Press, 2014) ISBN 978-1580055291
- Unstuck w/ Noah Scalin (Voyageur Press, 2011) ISBN 0760341346
- Robot Hearts w/ Cara Bruce and Shawna Kenney (Pinchback Press, 2010) ISBN 978-0982644508

== Discography ==
- The Last American Gladiator (2011), Storytelling/Americana/Pop
- The Neon Man and Me Soundtrack (2008), Americana/Folk
- Conversations with a Southern Wonder Boy (2004), Americana/Folk

== Awards and nominations ==
=== Storytelling awards ===
- Winner Chesterfield Education Foundation Bravo! Community Award. (2015).
- Winner Storytelling World Award for Best Action Stories for CD compilation The Last American Gladiator. (2013).
- Winner Best Drama Award for Best One-Man Play for The Neon Man and Me, awarded by United Solo Theatre Festival. (2012)
- Winner of The 2005 Groucho Award for Best One-Man Play for The Neon Man and Me, awarded by the ComedySportz Improv Theater.

=== Philanthropy awards ===
- US Laughter Ambassador Award, 2019
- Finalist 17th Annual People’s Choice Award for non-fiction, 2014
- Nominated for the Cabot Community Challenge Award, 2010
- Nominated for Virginia Governor's Award in the Arts, 2008
- Winner of Style Weekly's Top 40 under 40 Award, 2006
