= Manchester High School (Virginia) =

Public high school in Virginia, US

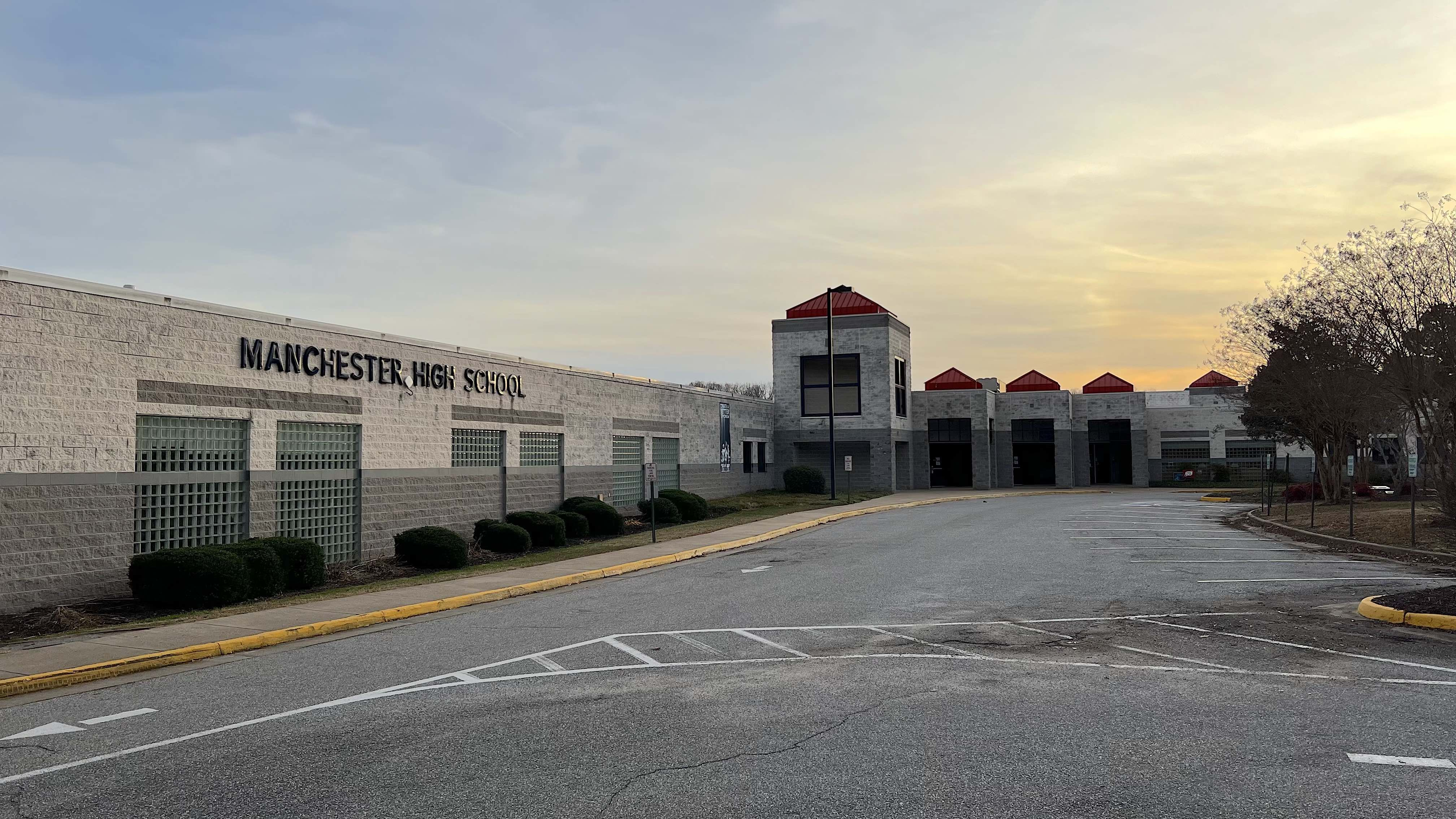

Location
- 12601 Bailey Bridge Road; Midlothian, Virginia 23112; 37°24′25.7″N 77°37′23.7″W

Information
- School type: Public high school
- Founded: 1924
- School district: Chesterfield County Public Schools
- Superintendent: John Murray
- Principal: Christy Ellis
- Teaching staff: 164.89 (on an FTE basis)
- Grades: 9–12
- Enrollment: 2,236 (2024–25)
- Student to teacher ratio: 13.56
- Language: English
- Campus: Suburban
- Colors: orange, and blue
- Athletics conference: Virginia High School League; AAA Central Region; AAA Dominion District
- Mascot: Lancer
- Rivals: Cosby High School; Meadowbrook High School
- Newspaper: MHS Scroll
- Feeder schools: Bailey Bridge Middle School; Providence Middle School
- Specialty centers: Mass Communications, Spanish Immersion
- Website: Official Site

Manchester High School is a high school located in the unincorporated town of Midlothian in Chesterfield County, Virginia, United States.

The school is a part of Chesterfield County Public Schools.

== History ==
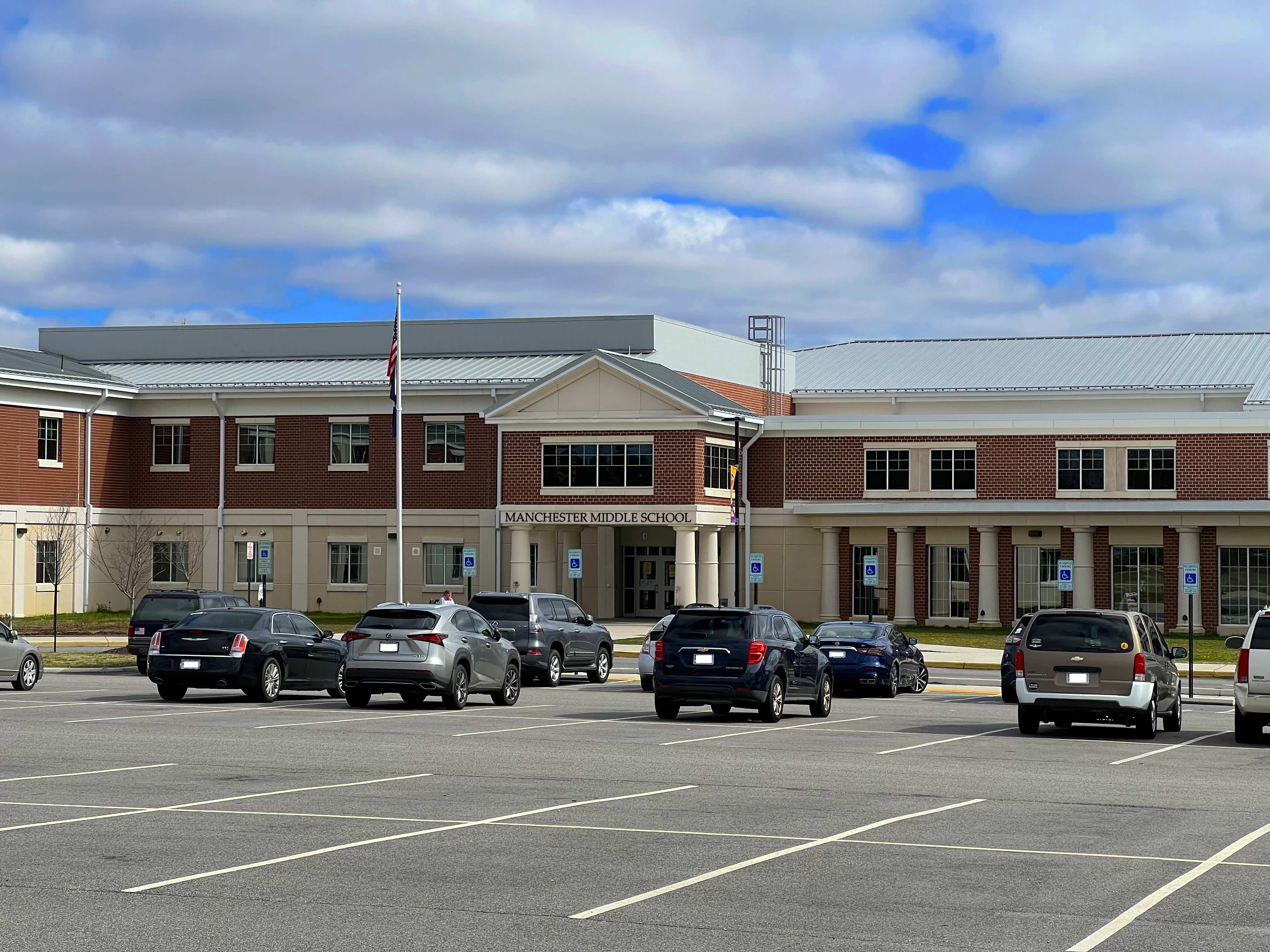
The old Manchester High School, now Manchester Middle.

Consolidation of three schools occurred in 1914, to form Elkhardt School (eventually Elkhardt Middle School) at 6300 Hull Street Road, which had a faculty of four, including the principal. Horse-drawn wagons provided the first publication transportation to the school in 1916. Replacement of the school's name came in 1924, with the school becoming Manchester District High School. In 1925, the first graduating class consisted of eight students. Steep population growth, following World War II, required that new facilities be built. Coming from this, in fall 1964 the school was moved to 7401 Hull Street Road (now Manchester Middle School). Heavy westward urban sprawl from the nearby city of Richmond, Virginia required yet another move in 1992. After this move, the school arrived to its current location. Now the school resides at 12601 Bailey Bridge Road.

== Campus ==
Manchester shares many of its facilities with the adjacent Bailey Bridge Middle School. It is home to Lloyd Swelnis Stadium, named after the long-time Manchester athletic director. In 2003 closed-circuit cameras were installed in the building and parking lots to provide better security for students and staff. An addition to the main building was completed in 2004 to house the Mass Communications and Spanish-Immersion Specialty Centers.

== Students ==
Manchester High School has a diverse student body, consisting of approximately 1900 students, and is reflective of the multiple ethnicities present in Chesterfield County. The opening of Cosby High School in 2006, and the new location and recreation of Clover Hill High School has alleviated the over-crowding at Manchester High, allowing for the reduction in number of trailers previously used as classrooms.

== Activities ==
Sports teams include baseball, basketball, football, cheerleading, volleyball, soccer, softball, field hockey, track and field, cross-country, tennis, wrestling, and golf. Notable clubs include a JROTC program, Foreign Language clubs, school news paper, Model UN, show choir, marching band, Red Cross and cheering. There is also a Mass Communication and a Spanish Immersion specialty center.

In 2018, Manchester High School won the Class 6 Virginia State Championship in Football.

== Notable alumni ==
- DaShaun Amos – professional American football player (class of 2012)
- Kei'Trel Clark – professional American football player (class of 2019)
- Kavell Conner – professional football player (San Diego Chargers) (class of 2004)
- Pearce Paul Creasman – professor of archaeology, Egyptology and dendrochronology (class of 2000); world junior champion, triathlon (2001–2002)
- Denny Hamlin – NASCAR driver (class of 1999)
- Domonic Jones – expatriate professional basketball player (class of 2000)
- Dick Lines – former professional baseball player (Washington Senators)
- Sean Marshall – professional baseball player (Cincinnati Reds) (class of 2001)
- Rada Owen – swimming coach and former competition swimmer
- Nichelle Lewis, actress
