= Midlothian High School =

Midlothian High School could refer to:

- Midlothian High School (Texas) in Midlothian, Texas
- Midlothian High School (Virginia) in Midlothian, Virginia
