= Mathsci =

Mathsci may refer to

- Mathematical sciences
- Mathematics and Science High School at Clover Hill
- MathSciNet, a database of the American Mathematical Society containing data for Mathematical Reviews and Current Mathematical Publications
