= Monacan High School =

Public high school in Virginia, US

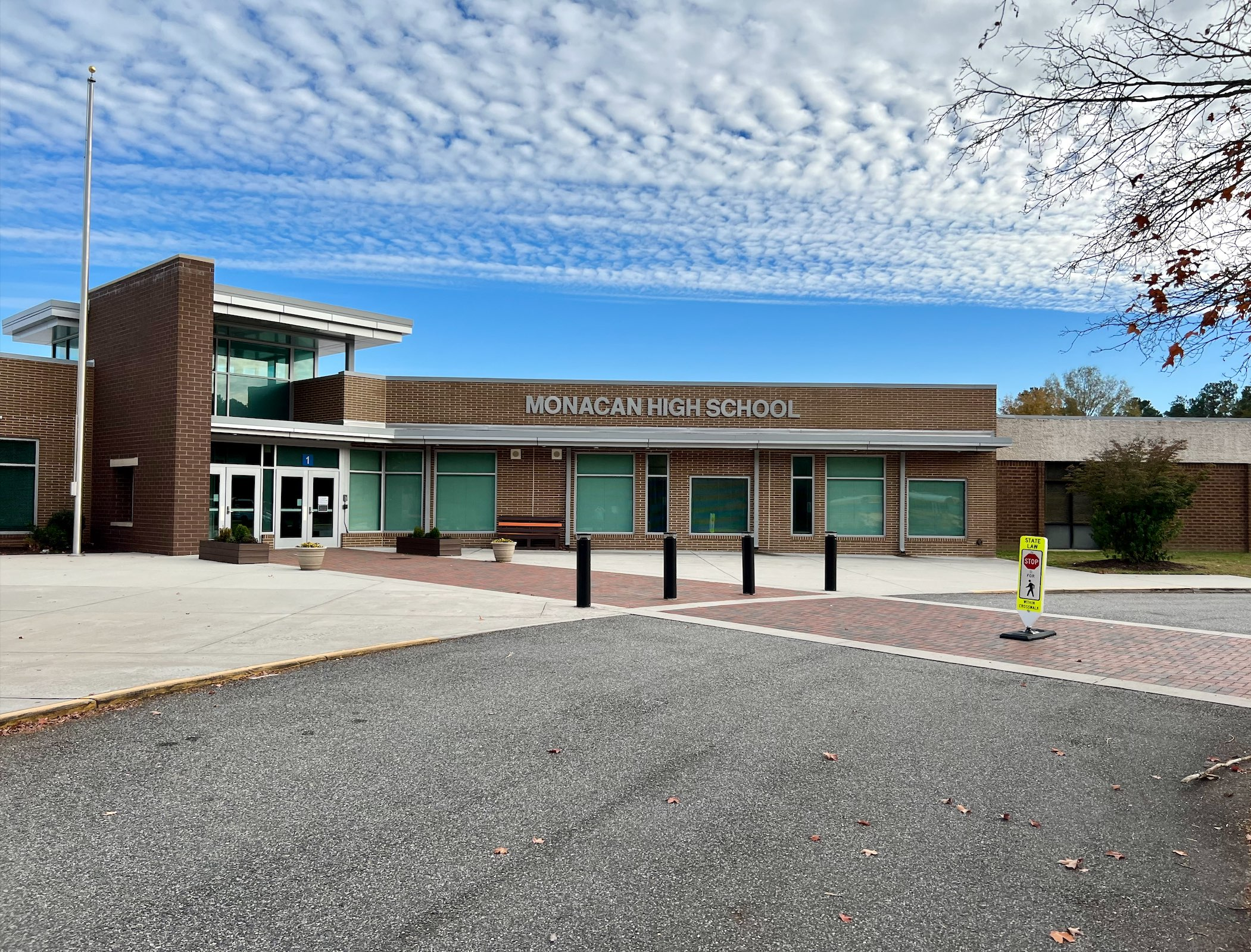
- Monacan High School front entrance, November 2023

Location
- 11501 Smoketree Drive; North Chesterfield, Virginia 23236; United States; 37°28′44.6″N 77°36′48″W

Information
- Type: Public high school
- Motto: Building respect through building relationships
- Established: 1979; 47 years ago
- School district: Chesterfield County Public Schools
- NCES District ID: 5100840
- Superintendent: John Murray
- NCES School ID: 510084001833
- Principal: Dr. Benjamin Shindler
- Teaching staff: 102.41 (FTE)
- Grades: 9–12
- Enrollment: 1,644 (2024–25)
- Student to teacher ratio: 16.05
- Campus type: Suburban
- Colors: Orange, white and black
- Athletics conference: Virginia High School League; Region 4B; Dominion District
- Mascot: Chiefs
- Rivals: Midlothian High School
- Feeder schools: Midlothian Middle School; Providence Middle School; Manchester Middle School
- Specialty centers: Humanities, Health Professions and Therapies
- Website: Official Site

Monacan High School is a public secondary school in Chesterfield County, Virginia, United States, near the city of Richmond.

The school was founded in 1979, and is a part of Chesterfield County Public Schools. Its enrollment is roughly 1550 students. The building underwent a major renovation in the summer of 2015 and into the fall of 2016. The almost $30 million project brought a brand new fine arts wing, including new band, chorus, orchestra, and black box theater spaces, along with a music production lab. Connected to the new fine arts wing is a new athletic space including a new three-court gym and premier training facility. Also, a part of the renovation was brand new main and counseling office spaces along with a brand new library, complete with academic meeting rooms and a multi-media recording studio.

== Sports ==
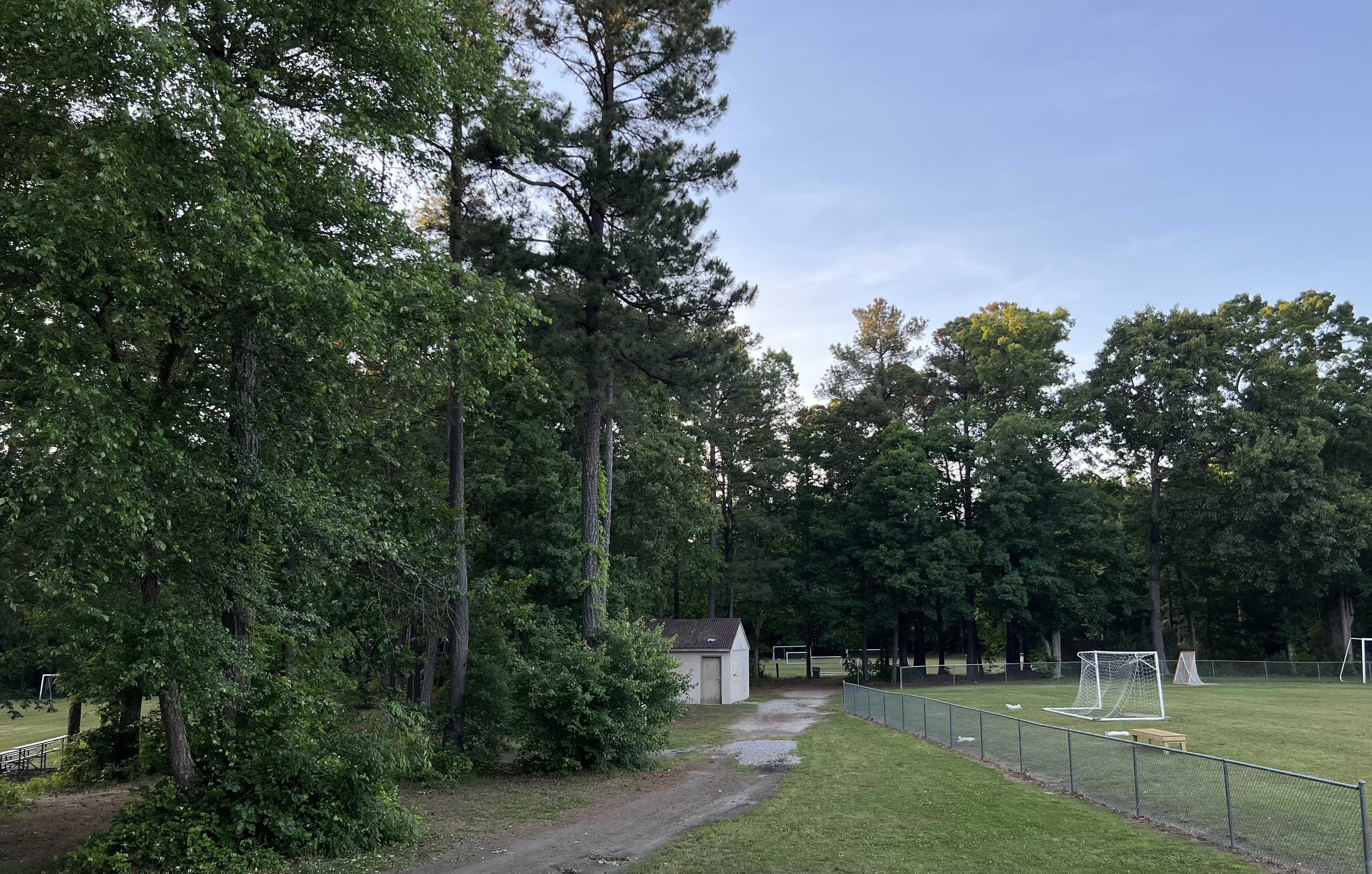
Monacan's multi-field athletic complex

Sports include golf, football, volleyball, cheerleading, dance, cross country, indoor track, wrestling, basketball, swimming, soccer, lacrosse, outdoor track, baseball, softball, tennis, forensics and debate. The Chiefs Stadium underwent a massive renovation in 2013 when they replaced all the bleachers and installed new sound systems. In 2023, the football stadium underwent more renovations when all new turf field was added plus new goal posts.

Monacan High School is a member of the Dominion District in all sports. Notable moments in Monacan sports include:

- 1979 – 1986 Boys Cross Country went undefeated in Dual Meets and won eight straight Dominion District Championships
- 1980 – Boys Cross Country Team wins Group AAA State Championships
- 1981 – Girls and Boys Cross Country Teams win Group AAA State Championships
- 1982 – Boys Tennis Wins Dominion District and Central Regional Championships
- 1983 – Boys Baseball Team wins the Central District Baseball Championship and Central Region Baseball Championship
- 1985 – Boys Basketball Team beats Number One Ranked Petersburg Team and goes to State Playoffs
- 1985 – Boys Baseball Team completes an undefeated regular season; Six members of the Boys Baseball Team help American Legion Post 186 win the World Series
- 1989 – Boys Baseball Team wins Central Region Baseball Championship and the Football Team wins Central Region Football Semifinals
- 1992 – Debate Team wins VHSL State Championship
- 1994 – Girls Basketball Team wins Central Region Girls Basketball Championship (63–62)
- 1998 – Boys Volleyball Team wins State Group 3A Championship
- 2000 – Forensics Team wins 3A State Tournament
- 2002 – Boys Volleyball Team wins State Group 3A Championship
- 2004 – Boys Tennis Team wins Dominion District Championship (15–0) Central Region Finalists
- 2006 – Baseball wins State Group 3A Championship
- 2014 – Girls Basketball Team wins 4A States
- 2015 – Girls Basketball Team wins 4A States
- 2015 – Boys Basketball Team wins 4A States as the lowest seeded team, upsetting two number one seeds en route to the championship
- 2016 – Girls Soccer Team finishes with an undefeated regular season record, the first girls team in school history
- 2016 – Boys Volleyball Team wins 4A States
- 2016 – Girls Basketball Team wins 4A States
- 2017 – Girls Basketball wins 4A States.
- 2017 – Girls Basketball finishes the regular season and postseason undefeated, the first complete perfect season in school history
- 2017 – Girls Basketball climbed as high as the #2 team in the country
- 2024 – Boys Tennis wins State in doubles

== Academics ==
Monacan offers standard core classes along with honors classes, electives, Dual enrollment Classes and Advanced Placement classes.

Advanced Placement Program classes at Monacan currently include Biology, Calculus AB, Chemistry, Computer Science, English/Literature, Environmental Science, Human Geography, Physics, Psychology, Spanish, Statistics, U.S. History and U.S. Government.

Advanced Placement classes such as Art History, French, German, Latin, Music Theory and World History are offered on an enrollment basis, if there are enough interested students to create the class.

Monacan's World Language Department offers Latin, Spanish, and French. In the past, Japanese and Greek have been taught, but in the 2006–2007 school year, these subjects were not offered. German was taken out of the course offerings in the 2009–2010 school year.

In 2008, Monacan's music department earned the Virginia Music Educators Association Blue Ribbon Award. The Performing Arts at Monacan offer classes in choir, band, orchestra, guitar and theatre. Monacan also earned the Blue Ribbon Award in 2009, 2010, 2011, 2012, 2013, 2014, 2015, 2016 and 2017.

In 2016, the Academic Team won the Conference 20 Scholastic Bowl Championship.

== Center for the Humanities ==
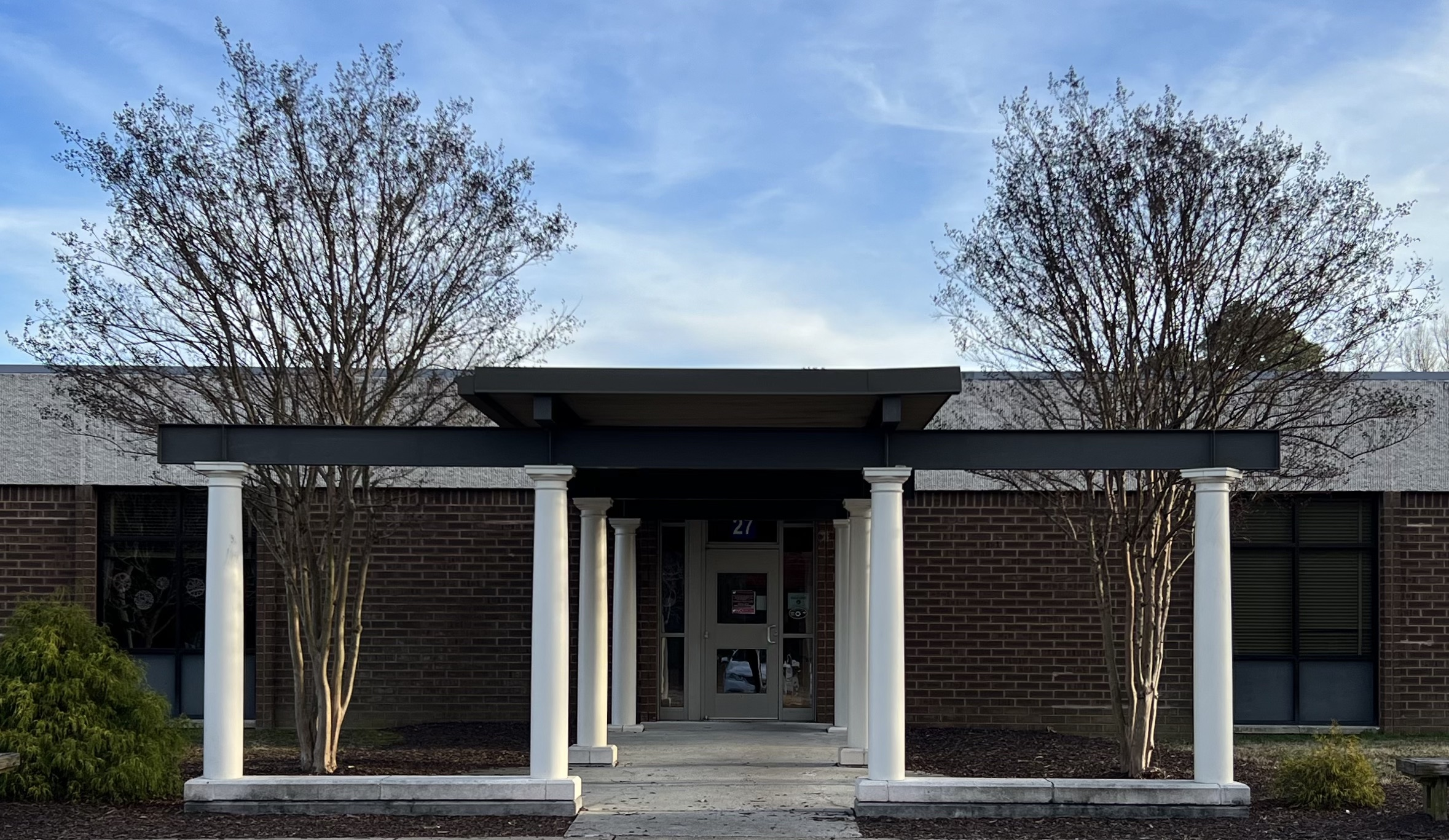
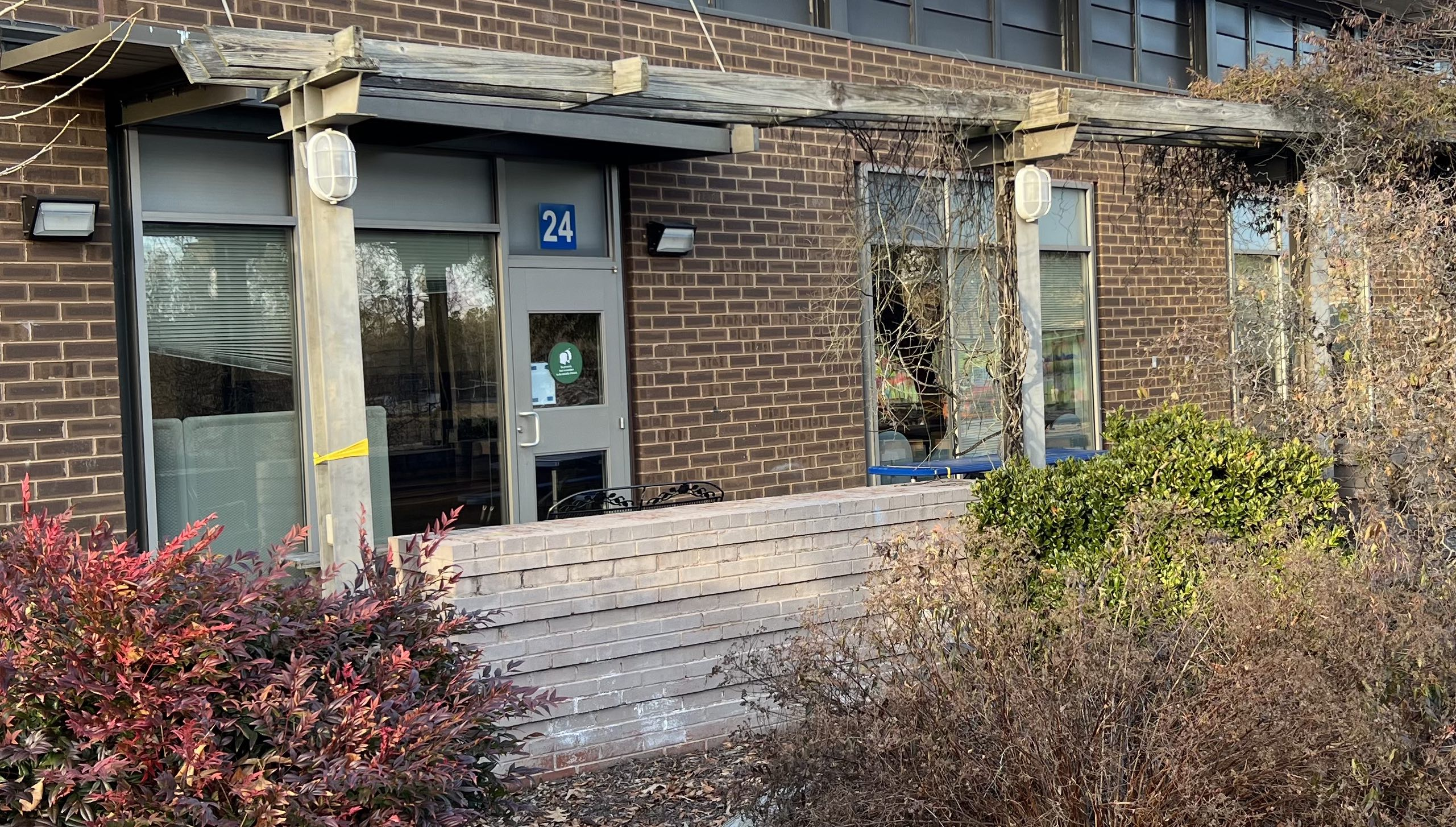
The front entrance of the Humanities Center (top) evokes Greco-Roman stone architecture, while the back entrance is inspired by Ancient Greek wooden architecture.

The Center for the Humanities is a selective specialty center at Monacan High School. Eighth-grade students must apply and be reviewed, which includes an interview. Applications from said students have grown to over 100 each year. The Center for the Humanities has a rigorous curriculum that requires all of its students to take certain courses and receive an Advanced Studies Diploma. The program enrolled its first students in the fall of 2000 and the first class graduated in 2004. The goal is an enriched, advanced liberal arts education. Requirements include:

- Four years of the course Perspectives on the Human Experience
- English 9, 10, 11 and AP English
- World History/Geography up to 1500 CE, AP European History, AP United States History and AP United States Government and Politics
- At least four years of a foreign language
- Four years of science, including Biology and either Chemistry or Physics
- Participation in an extended service-learning class

One of the foundations of the Humanities curriculum is the Perspectives on the Human Experience course. The course is unique to the Center for the Humanities, and integrates art, art history, history and other disciplines.

Another foundation of the Humanities curriculum is the Socratic Seminar, a student-led group discussion that focuses on one specific topic. Socratic Seminars aim to foster student leadership, communication skills and discussion techniques.

== Health Professions and Therapies Center ==
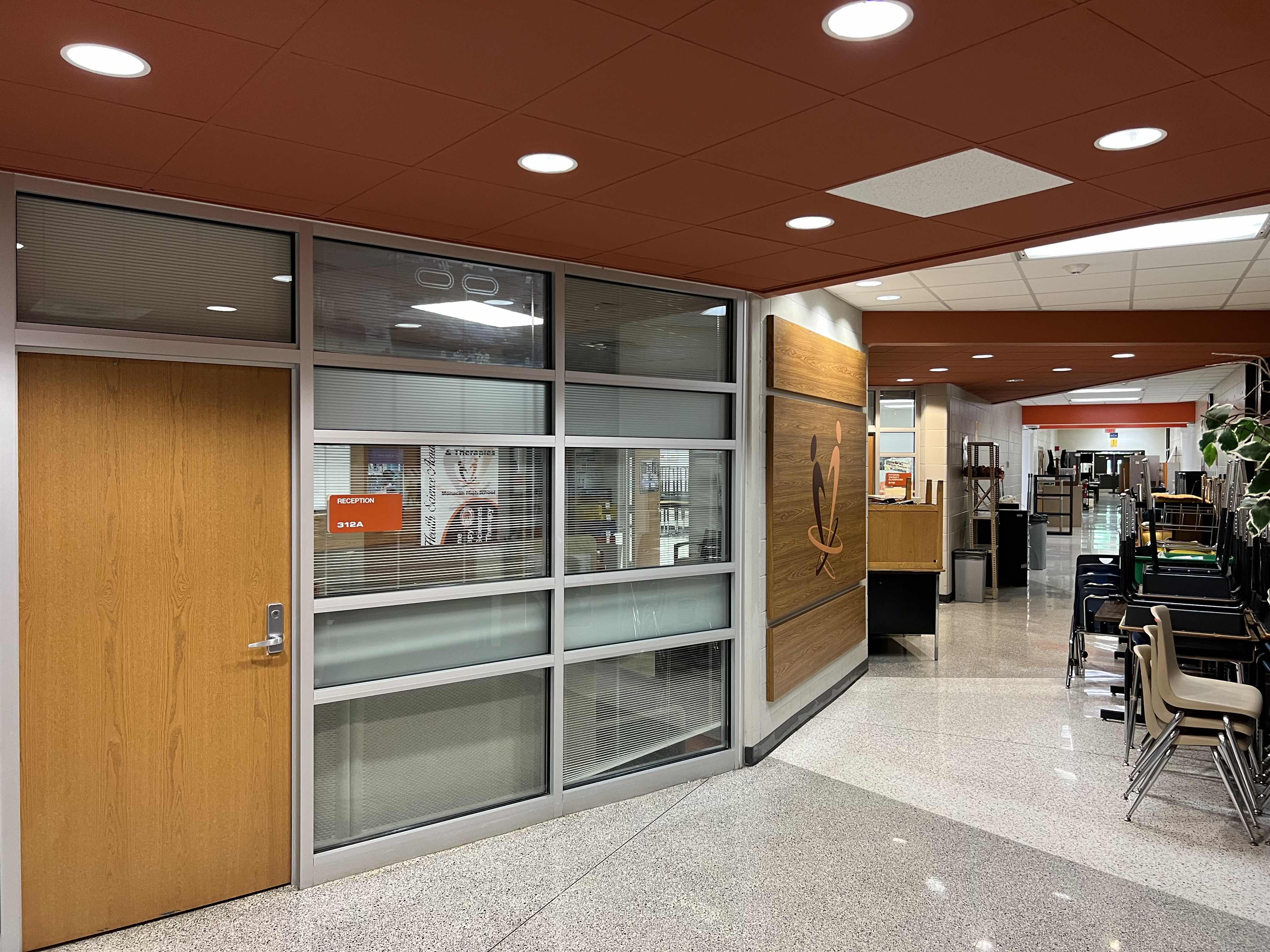
Health Professions and Therapies center.

The Health Professions and Therapies Center is a selective specialty center that provides students with academic and practical field experiences in preventative medicine and therapeutic health careers. Students explore health care careers that focus on therapy and prevention such as: sports medicine; athletic training; physical and occupational therapy; physical education; and exercise science.

Students choosing this center:

- Develop a strong foundation of knowledge and skills that would support a health care career in therapeutic or preventive health care, with a focus on sports medicine and/or athletic training, physical therapy, occupational therapy and human performance.
- Participate in lab-based practical and clinical applications.
- Demonstrate professional behavior and ethical decision-making skills.
- Assess problems critically and develop practical solutions.
- Communicate clearly and concisely using appropriate terminology.

== Monacan High School Marching Chiefs ==
The Monacan High School Marching Chiefs are a seven time Virginia Honor Band and a six-time VMEA Blue Ribbon School for Music. On October 29, 2016, the Marching Chiefs earned a final VBODA State Competition Rating of 85.0/100, "Superior". On September 28, 2018, the Marching Chiefs took their 2018 Field Show entitled, "The Music of Santana" to the Hermitage Classic. Earning 1st Place Music and 3rd Place Overall in class 3A, their total score came to 81/100.

== 2018 VHSL Ken Tilley Student Leaders Conference at Monacan High School ==
Monacan High School was selected to be the site host for the 22nd Annual VHSL Ken Tilley Student Leaders Conference. Beating out several other applicants, Monacan made history by being both the smallest and oldest school to ever host the SLC. From the beginning, their conference committee had a dream to impact students and change the way they perceive themselves. It doesn't matter who you are or where you come from, anyone can be a leader. Anyone can change the world.

The conference helped students develop their leadership potential in the context of their schools and communities. With thought-provoking keynote speakers as well as breakout sessions that stimulated individual participation, it was one of the biggest leadership conferences in Virginia for high-school youth. Monacan's edition of the conference brought over 900 leaders from over 64 different high schools statewide.

== Notable alumni ==
- Kate Lindsey – mezzo-soprano opera singer, performed with the Metropolitan Opera, in Carnegie Hall, Washington D.C., Los Angeles, London, Paris, Munich and Vienna.
- Mark Parson – former professional football cornerback for the Houston Texans.
- Corey Reynolds – actor, known for his role as David Gabriel on the TV series The Closer.
- Megan Walker – professional basketball player for the Atlanta Dream of the WNBA. 9th overall pick in 2020 by the New York Liberty. Former UCONN Husky. Led Monacan to multiple State Titles.
- Dominique Butler - Creator of "Gentlemen this is the walkway, not the talkway."
