= Griffin Roberts =

American baseball player (born 1996)

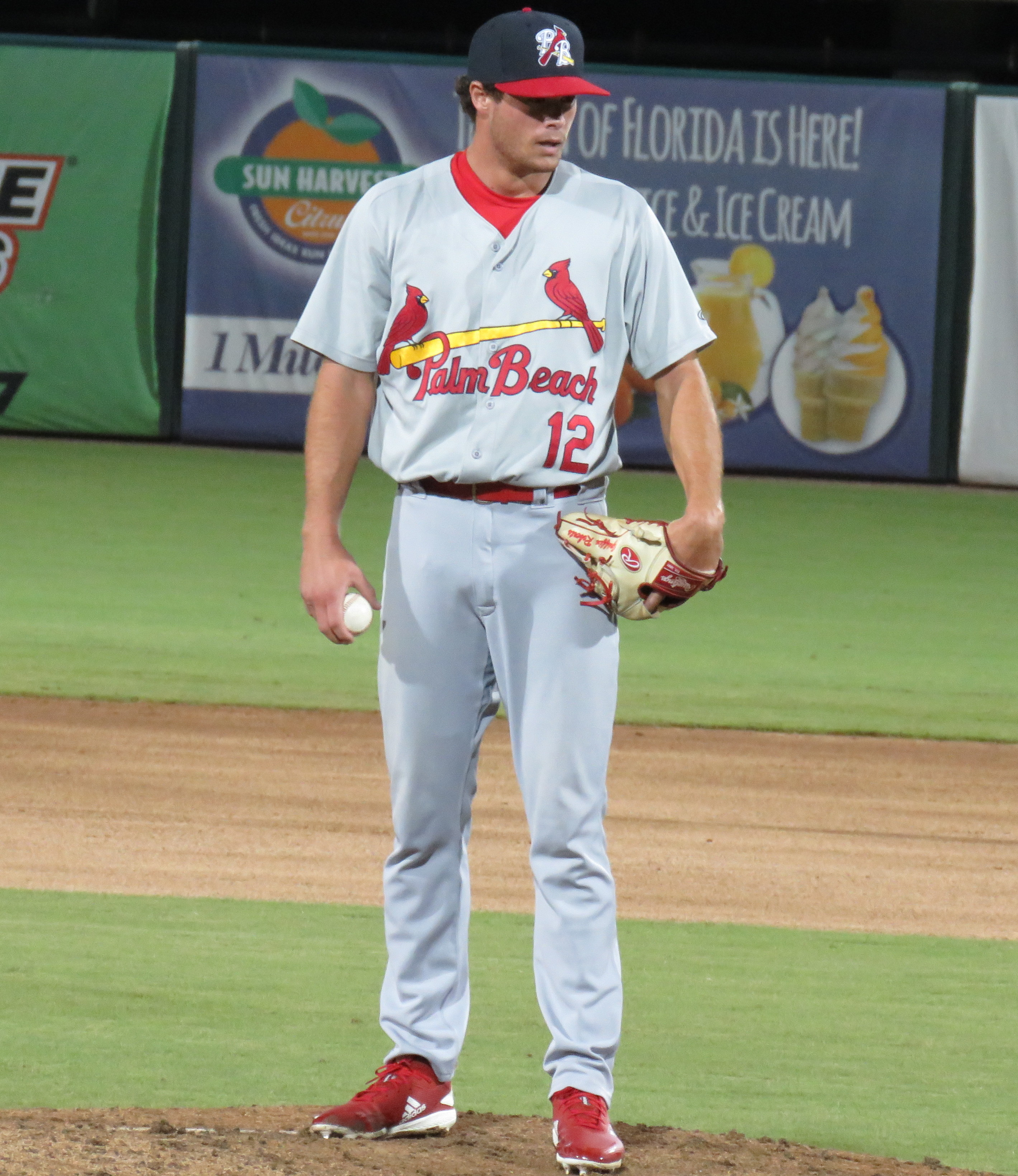
- Roberts with the Palm Beach Cardinals
- Pitcher
- Born: June 13, 1996 (age 30); Midlothian, Virginia, U.S.
- Bats: Right Throws: Right
- Stats at Baseball Reference

Griffin Daniel Roberts (born June 13, 1996) is an American former professional baseball pitcher. Roberts was drafted by the St. Louis Cardinals in the 1st round of the 2018 Major League Baseball draft. Despite this, he never played in the major leagues after spending parts of four seasons in the Cardinals system.

== Amateur career ==
Roberts graduated from James River High School in Midlothian, Virginia. As a senior, he pitched to a 6–0 record with a 1.24 ERA. He was not selected out of high school in the 2015 Major League Baseball draft and he enrolled at Wake Forest University where he played college baseball for the Wake Forest Demon Deacons.

In 2016, as a freshman, Roberts struggled with his command. In 15 2/3 innings pitched that year, he walked 18 batters, threw seven wild pitches, and hit five batters while compiling a 9.19 ERA. As a sophomore in 2017, he greatly improved, and became Wake Forest's closer, finishing the year with a 2–5 record, a 2.19 ERA, and eight saves to go along with striking out 80 batters in 53 1/3 innings. He was named to the All-ACC Second Team.

After his sophomore year, Roberts was drafted by the Minnesota Twins in the 29th round of the 2017 Major League Baseball draft, but he did not sign and returned to Wake Forest. That same summer, he played collegiate summer baseball for the Wareham Gatemen of the Cape Cod Baseball League, and was named a league all-star. As a junior in 2018, he transitioned into a starting pitcher, and became Wake Forest's Friday night starter, going 5–4 with a 3.82 ERA while striking out an ACC-best 130 batters in 96 2/3 innings. He was named to the All-ACC Second Team for the second season in a row.

== Professional career ==
=== St. Louis Cardinals ===
Roberts was selected by the St. Louis Cardinals with the 43rd overall selection in the 2018 Major League Baseball draft. Roberts agreed to terms with the Cardinals and received a $1,664,200 signing bonus. He made seven appearances for the Gulf Coast Cardinals of the Rookie-level Gulf Coast League and one appearance for the Palm Beach Cardinals of the Class A-Advanced Florida State League, pitching to a combined 5.59 ERA over 9 2/3 innings. After the season, he was suspended 50 games for his second positive test for a drug of abuse. Roberts was activated from his suspension on May 29, 2019, and was assigned to Palm Beach. Over 15 games (13 starts) with Palm Beach, Roberts went 1–7 with a 6.44 ERA, striking out 36 while walking 35 over 65 2/3 innings. He was selected to play in the Arizona Fall League for the Glendale Desert Dogs following the season.

Roberts did not play a minor league game in 2020 due to the cancellation of the minor league season caused by the COVID-19 pandemic. To begin 2021, he was assigned to the Springfield Cardinals of the Double-A Central, but appeared in only two games for the season. He split the 2022 season between the Florida Complex League Cardinals, Palm Beach, and Springfield, posting a 9.25 ERA with 37 strikeouts and 26 walks over 24 1/3 innings.

Roberts was released by the Cardinals organization on March 30, 2023.

=== Spire City Ghost Hounds ===
On August 8, 2023, Roberts signed with the Spire City Ghost Hounds of the Atlantic League of Professional Baseball. However, two days later, Roberts retired from professional baseball.
