= Mark Parson =

American gridiron football player (born 1986)

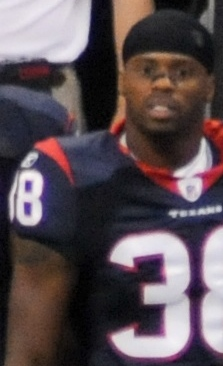
- Parson with the Texans in 2010

No. 38
- Position: Cornerback

Personal information
- Born: May 9, 1986 (age 40); Chesterfield, Virginia
- Listed height: 5 ft 9 in (1.75 m)
- Listed weight: 170 lb (77 kg)

Career information
- High school: Fork Union Military Academy (Fork Union, Virginia) Monacan High School (Richmond, Virginia)
- College: Ohio
- NFL draft: 2009: undrafted

Career history
- Houston Texans (2009)*; New Orleans Saints (2009)*; Houston Texans (2009); New Orleans Saints (2010–2011)*; Edmonton Eskimos (2012)*
- * Offseason or practice squad member only
- Stats at Pro Football Reference

Mark Parson (born May 9, 1986) is an American former football cornerback. He was signed by the Houston Texans as an undrafted free agent in 2009. Born in Chesterfield Court House, Virginia, Parson attended Monacan High School in Richmond, Virginia and the Fork Union Military Academy. He played college football at Ohio University. Mark now runs a YouTube channel where he helps high school and college cornerbacks reach their goal of making the National Football League.

Parson was also a member of the New Orleans Saints and Edmonton Eskimos. He was released by the Edmonton Eskimos on June 3, 2012.
