= Luis Rendon =

Colombian-American soccer player (born 1993)

Personal information
- Full name: Luis Rendon
- Date of birth: November 27, 1993 (age 32)
- Place of birth: Barranquilla, Colombia
- Height: 5 ft 10 in (1.78 m)
- Position: Midfielder

Youth career
- 2004–2011: FC Richmond

College career
Years	Team	Apps	(Gls)
2011–2014	Duke Blue Devils	49	(3)

Senior career*
Years	Team	Apps	(Gls)
2014	RVA FC	11	(0)

International career
2010–2011	United States U18	6	(1)
- * Club domestic league appearances and goals

Luis Rendon (born November 27, 1993) is a Colombian-American soccer player who last played college soccer for Duke University. Rendon is best known for winning the Gatorade Boys' Soccer Player of the Year award in 2011, a national award given to the best high school soccer player in the United States. Rendon was inducted into the Virginia-DC Soccer Hall of Fame in 2020.

Upon finishing high school, Rendon played four years of collegiate soccer with Duke University. Additionally, Rendon played in the National Premier Soccer League for RVA FC, prior to the club relocating to Fredericksburg.

== Career ==
=== Youth and college ===
Born in Barranquilla, Rendon moved to Midlothian, Virginia (a suburb of Richmond), when he was a child. Growing up, Rendon played youth soccer for FC Richmond, and high school soccer for Cosby High School. A standout player, Rendon helped Cosby reach the state championship in 2011. On May 19, 2011, Rendon won the Gatorade National Player of the Year Award. Rendon was the first player from Virginia to win the award.

Ahead of the 2011 NCAA Division I men's soccer season, Rendon committed to playing college soccer for Duke, choosing Duke over Virginia, VCU, William & Mary, and Wake Forest.

== International ==
Luis Rendon was part of the United States under-18 men's national team program through high school.

== Personal life ==
A Richmond, Virginia native and former player of FC Richmond, Rendon has been said to be an influence to several future professional soccer players in the region, such as Nick Taitague, who currently plays for Schalke 04.

Upon graduating from Duke, Rendon retired from competitive soccer, and worked at Teamworks in the Research Triangle, before relocating to the Dallas–Fort Worth metroplex. He made 49 appearances for Duke, scoring three goals.

== Awards ==
- RTD All-Metro Boys' Soccer Player of the Year: 2011
- Gatorade High School Soccer Player of the Year Award: 2011
- FC Richmond Hall of Fame: 2012
