= James River High School (Chesterfield County, Virginia) =

Public high school in Virginia, US

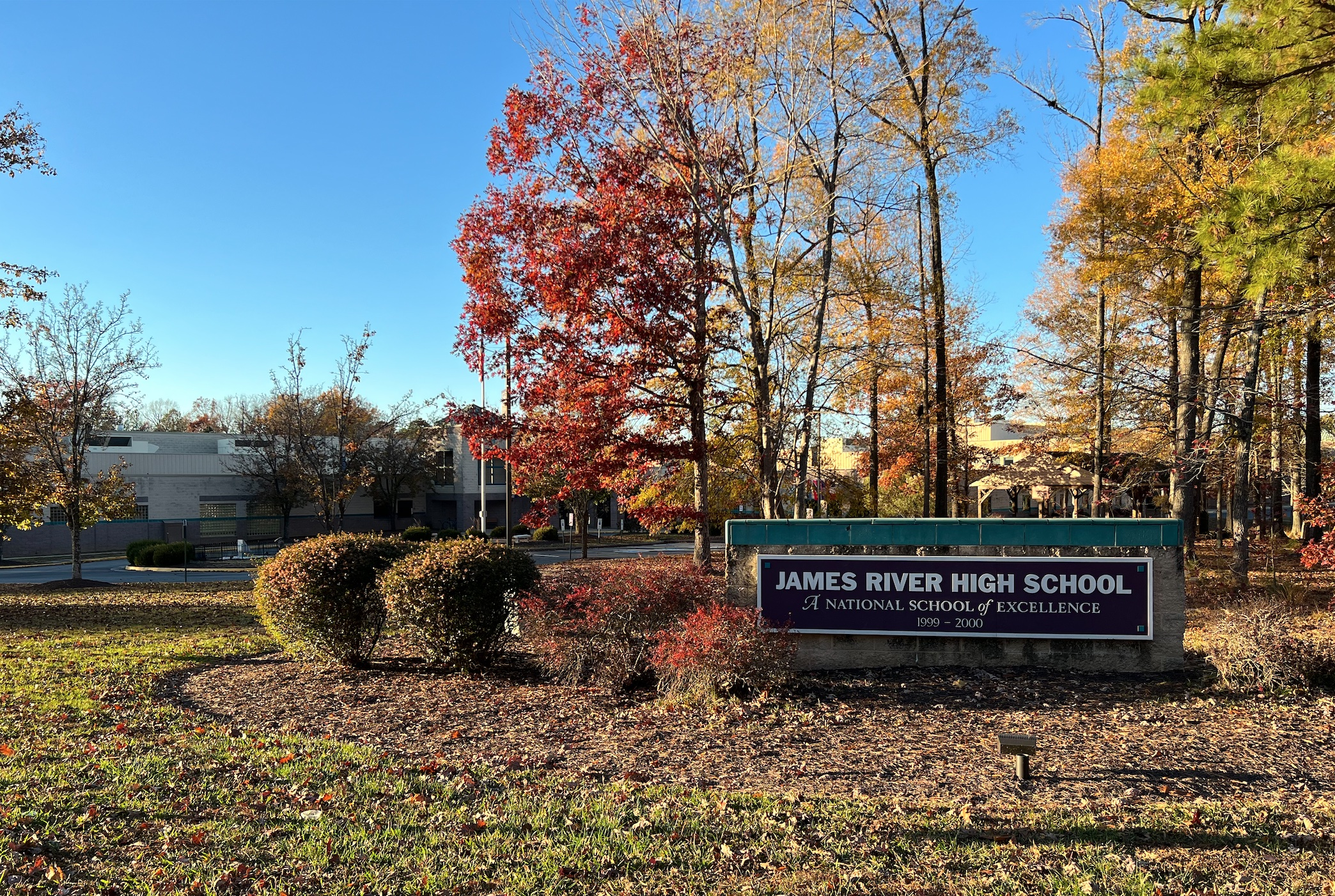

Location
- 3700 James River Road; Midlothian, Chesterfield County, Virginia 23113; 37°33′9″N 77°38′57″W

Information
- School type: Public high school
- Founded: 1994
- Locale: Suburban, Large
- School district: Chesterfield County Public Schools
- NCES District ID: 5100840
- Superintendent: John Murray
- NCES School ID: 510084000766
- Principal: Amanda Voelker
- Teaching staff: 118.84 (on an FTE basis)
- Grades: 9–12
- Enrollment: 1,842 (2024–25)
  - Grade 9: 488
  - Grade 10: 477
  - Grade 11: 426
  - Grade 12: 451
  - Male: 952
  - Female: 890
- Student to teacher ratio: 15.50
- Language: English
- Colors: Purple, and Green
- Nickname: Rapids
- Feeder schools: Providence Middle School; Robious Middle School
- Rival schools: Midlothian High School, Cosby High School
- Specialty center: Leadership and International Relations
- Athletic conference: Virginia High School League; AAA Central Region; AAA Dominion District
- Website: Official Site

James River High School is located in northwestern Chesterfield County, Virginia, United States. James River is a part of Chesterfield County Public Schools.

== Academics ==
According to U.S. News & World Report, JRHS ranks among America's top 8,803 schools, 173rd in Virginia, 21st in the Richmond Metro Area, and 4th best performing high school in Chesterfield County Public Schools out of their 11 high schools. 38% of students participate in AP classes. The graduation rate is 92%.

== Athletics ==
The James River baseball team won in 2007 and 2008 the Group AAA State Baseball Championship. In 2008 the Rapids were ranked 19th in the nation in High School Baseball. In 2011 the team had another run at the state championship but lost in the semi-finals. They are considered one of the top high schools in Virginia baseball. Consistently ranking top 200 in the Nation and top 10 in Virginia.

In 2008 the men's golf team won its first championship in 2008 VHSL Group AAA State Championship.

In 2013 the men's golf team would win the championship. They would go onto winning three consecutive championships in 2014 and 2015.

In 2016, the men's lacrosse team made it to State Championship but lost. They were ranked #10 overall in Virginia.

In 2010, the men's volleyball team won their first state championship. The team has gone on to win six more state titles (2011, 2015, 2016, 2018, 2019, 2020) along with two runner-up state championship appearances (2014, 2022). James River is considered one of the most elite high school volleyball programs in the country.

Notable volleyball alumni include Darren Kilby, Sam Albus, and Mitchell Ford. All were state and regional players of the year in 2010, 2011, and 2012 respectively.

== Notable alumni ==
- Kellie Wells (2000) – track and field athlete, Olympic bronze medalist
- Shannon Taylor (2004) – professional field hockey player, Olympian
- Nathan Kirby (2012) – professional baseball player, drafted 40th Overall in the 2015 Major League Baseball draft
- Cullen Large (2014) – professional baseball player, played in the Toronto Blue Jays organization
- Alex McMurtry (2014) – gymnast, 4x NCAA champion
- Griffin Roberts (2015) – professional baseball player who played in the St. Louis Cardinals organization
- Vinnie Pasquantino (2016) – baseball player for the Kansas City Royals
- Nick Taitague (2017) – former professional soccer player
- Nick Mira (2019) – record producer, Internet Money Records
- Morgan Bullock (2017) – dancer
- Josh Winder (2015) – professional baseball player, played for the Minnesota Twins
- Connelly Early (c. 2020) – professional baseball player
- Kameron Simmonds (2022) – soccer player for the Florida State Seminoles, represents Jamaica internationally

== Specialty Center ==
James River High School is home to the specialty center for Leadership and International Relations. The program was founded in 2002.

== Speech and Debate Team ==
James River High School is also known for its widely renowned speech and debate team, winning 5 VHSL State Championships (2021, 2023, 2024, 2025, and 2026). The team has had continued success under current and longtime coaches/teachers Jessie Sanchez and Joey Sanchez Tucker, with notable alumni inluding Rowan E. Milton-Benoit, Luke Baker, Molly Gorman, and Kennedy Coffin.

=== Enrollment in Leadership and International Relations ===
The James River High School Center for Leadership and International Relations has up to 350 applicants per year, and only about 50 are accepted.
