= L. C. Bird High School =

Public high school in Virginia, US

Lloyd C. Bird High School
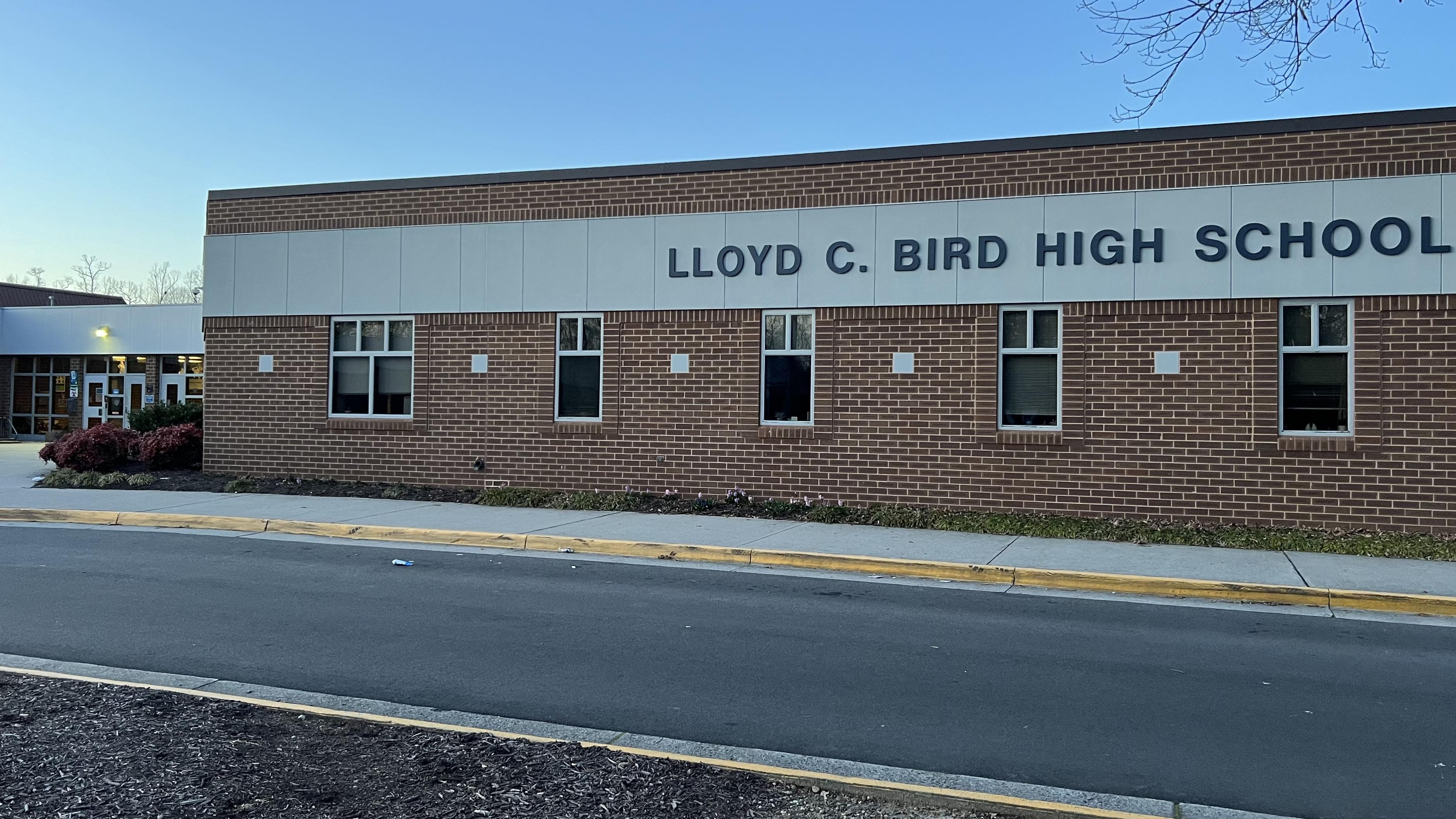

Location
- 10301 Courthouse Road; Chesterfield, Virginia 23832-6616; 37°23′18.7″N 77°29′39.8″W

Information
- School type: Public high school
- Founded: 1978
- School district: Chesterfield County Public Schools
- NCES District ID: 5100840
- Superintendent: John Murray
- NCES School ID: 510084000337
- Principal: Adrienne Blanton
- Teaching staff: 144.39 (on an FTE basis)
- Grades: 9–12
- Enrollment: 2,131 (2024–25)
- Student to teacher ratio: 14.76
- Language: English
- Campus: Suburban
- Colors: Navy blue, Skyhawk blue, white
- Athletics conference: Virginia High School League; Dominion District; Region 5C
- Mascot: Skyhawk
- Rival: Meadowbrook High School; Thomas Dale High School
- Feeder schools: George W. Carver Middle School; Falling Creek Middle School; Salem Church Middle School
- Specialty center: Engineering Studies
- Website: Official Site

Lloyd C. Bird High School is a public high school in Chesterfield, an unincorporated community in Chesterfield County, Virginia, United States. It is part of Chesterfield County Public Schools and is located at 10301 Courthouse Road. It is named for former Virginia state senator Lloyd C. Bird.

== Accreditation ==
Lloyd C. Bird High School has consistently reached AYP according to the standards of No Child Left Behind each year since the inception of the program.

== Academics ==
According to U.S. News & World Report, L. C. Bird High School was ranked 15,674th in America, 1,692nd in Virginia, 33rd in the Richmond Metro Area, and 8th of the 11 schools in CCPS. 21% of students participated in AP courses, and the graduation rate is 47%.

== Athletics ==
The mascot is a Skyhawk and the sports teams play in the Dominion District and Region 5C. They were members of the Central Region before VHSL realignment. Bird won the last VHSL Division 6 State Championship in 2012 (before realignment) with a 14–0 record. They repeated as state champions in 2013 with a 15–0 record, this time in class 5A. The Cardinals then claimed their third straight state title in 2014 (also in 5A) with a 13–2 record. They are ranked 10th nationally (through 2013) by winning percentage of all the high schools in the United States with over 300 games played. They have also won 25 district championships in 44 years of play. The Skyhawks are 388-110-2 in 44 seasons (1978–2021).

Lloyd C. Bird has also been to the state playoffs in many other sports including baseball, boys' and girls' basketball and many others. The boys' basketball team won the 5A state championship in 2017. In 2018, 2019, 2020, 2021 the boys won 5A indoor state track and field championship. In 2018, 2019, 2021, and 2022, the boys captured the 5A outdoor state track and field championship.

== Governor's Academy for Engineering Studies ==
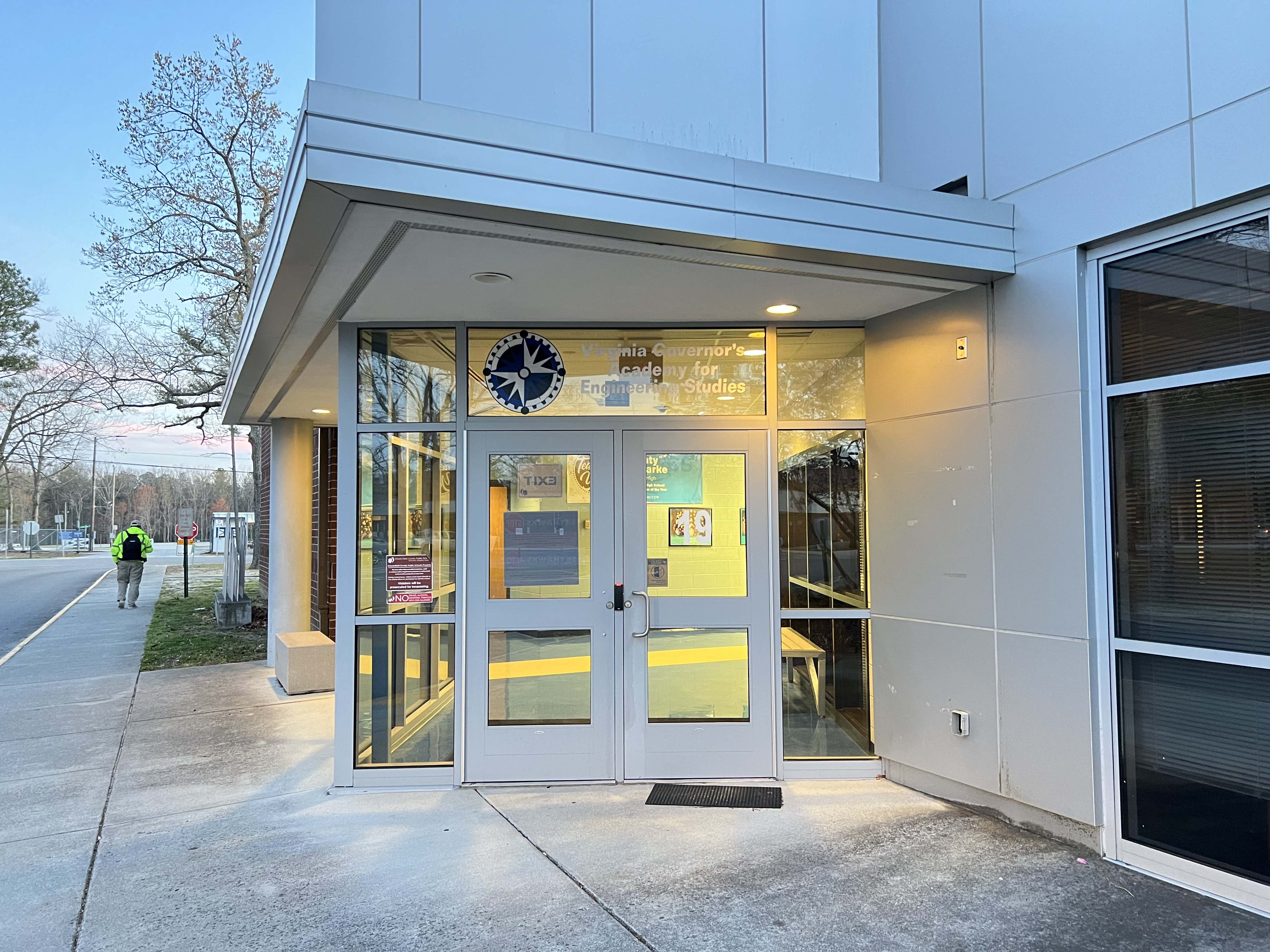
The engineering academy's entrance at Bird.

L. C. Bird High School hosts the Governor's Career and Technical Academy for Engineering Studies, a specialty center with two career pathways:

1. science and mathematics for engineering
2. engineering technology

Plans for the center began with the formation of a planning committee in March 1999. The first freshman class of 32 students was admitted in the fall of 2000, part of Bird's class of 2004. Later cohorts reached up to 50 students per year.

According to the Virginia Department of Education website, the centers are "to provide:

- Opportunities to take advanced classes in mathematics, science and other core-content courses that will result in college credit while in high school;
- A constant utilization of integrated computer skills;
- A basis of practical understanding of engineering through an emphasis on design projects;
- A detailed overview of expectations in a variety of engineering and engineering technology fields;
- Opportunities for field experiences to foster a deeper understanding of the correlation between class work and the work environment; and
- Information to help students make more informed decisions about their future educational and career plans."

The center is also "centered around a lab experience to better prepare the student for a rapidly changing technologically based field."

== Notable alumni ==
- Doug Chapman, former NFL running back
- Slash Coleman, storyteller and writer
- Jalen Elliott, NFL player
- Meg Gill, president & co-founder of Golden Road Brewing
- Vince Gilligan, writer, director and producer; creator of Breaking Bad and Better Call Saul
- Anthony Harris, current NFL Defensive Back for the Philadelphia Eagles
- Tyrese Rice, Boston College All ACC First Team point guard; Maccabi Tel Aviv Euroleague champion
- Jason Snelling, former Atlanta Falcons running back (retired after the 2013 season)
- Kenny Williams III, 2017 NCAA National champion
