= Powhatan County Public Schools =

Public school system in Virginia, US

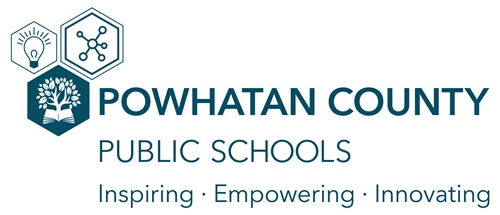

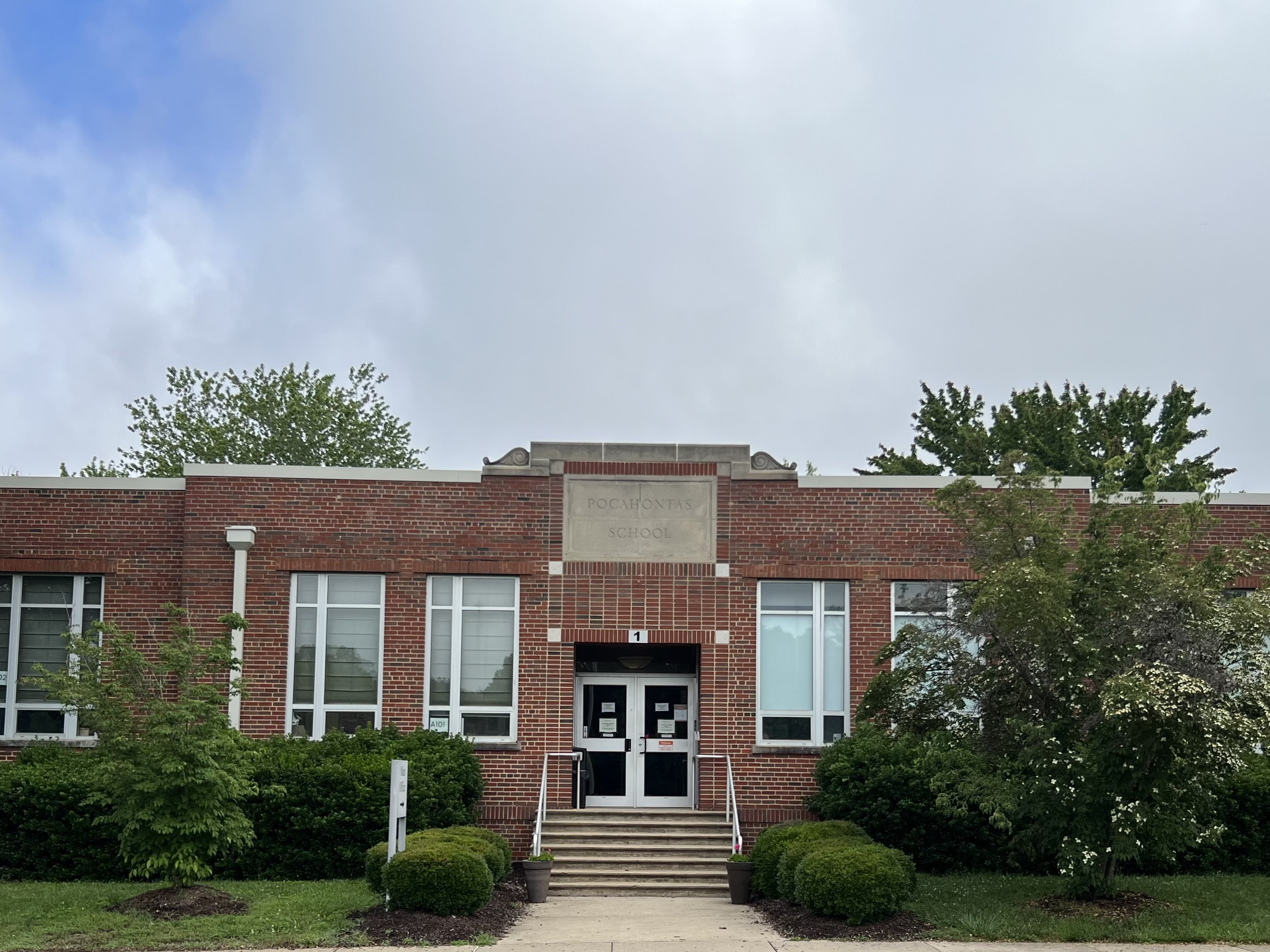
- Pocahontas Landmark Center

Address
- 4290 Anderson Hwy Powhatan, Virginia, 23139; United States
- Coordinates: 37°33′28.2″N 77°56′51.1″W

District information
- Motto: Empowering Today to Innovate Tomorrow
- Grades: Pre-K–12th
- Superintendent: Dr. Beth Teigen
- School board: District 1 – Vicki Hurt, Vice Chair District 2 – Susan Smith District 3 – Jeanne Wade District 4 – Dr. James Taylor, Chair District 5 – Michele Ward
- Schools: 5
- Budget: $58,561,000 (2022-23)
- NCES District ID: 5103030

Students and staff
- Students: 4,077 (2024–25)
- Teachers: 300.00 (on an FTE basis)
- Student–teacher ratio: 13.59
- Colors: 🟧⬛

Other information
- Website: www.powhatan.k12.va.us

Powhatan County Public Schools is the public school system of Powhatan County, Virginia, United States. As of 2024, there are about 4,200 students enrolled in 5 accredited schools. The district is led by superintendent Dr. Beth Teigen.

== Schools ==
=== High Schools (9–12) ===
Name	Notes	Image
Powhatan High School	The facility was completed in 2003.	

=== Middle Schools (6–8) ===
Name	Notes	Image
Powhatan Middle School	Formerly Powhatan Junior High School, the building was torn down and rebuilt in 2018 to be Powhatan Middle School. The facility is 48,000 sq. ft., and 2 stories.	

=== Elementary Schools (PreK–5) ===
Name	Constructed	Image
Powhatan Elementary School	1987	
Pocahontas Elementary School	1996	
Flat Rock Elementary School	2008	

== Other facilities ==
Pocahontas Landmark Center (pictured in infobox), previously known as Pocahontas Middle School was renovated in 2019 to house the district's administration staff and school board meeting room.

Powhatan Transportation Facility is a 16,000 sq. ft. facility that houses the school district's dispatching department, and 3 maintenances garages for district busses and vehicles. The facility also has built in fuel pumps and a 2.5 acre parking lot for dispatch staff and busses.
