= Powhatan High School =

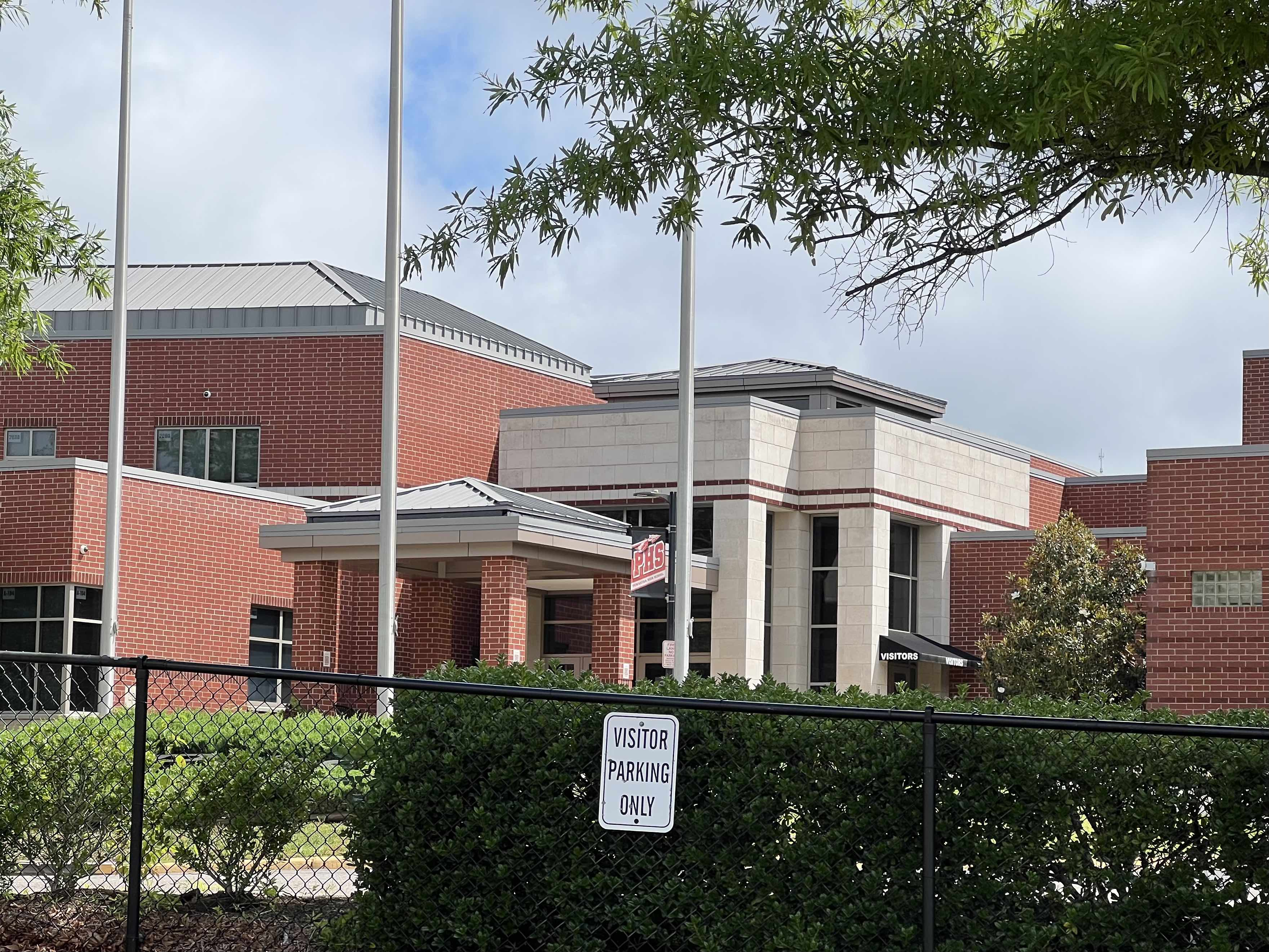

Location
- 1800 Judes Ferry Road; Powhatan, Virginia 23139; 37°31′20.1″N 77°48′2.6″W

Information
- School type: Public High School
- Founded: 2003
- School district: Powhatan County Public Schools
- Superintendent: Dr. Beth Teigen
- Principal: Michael Pierce
- Teaching staff: 88.20 (FTE)
- Grades: 9–12
- Enrollment: 1328 (2024–25)
  - Grade 9: 346
  - Grade 10: 333
  - Grade 11: 320
  - Grade 12: 329
- Student to teacher ratio: 15.06
- Colors: Black, Orange
- Athletics conference: Dominion District
- Mascot: Indians
- Communities served: Powhatan County, Virginia
- Feeder schools: Powhatan Middle School
- Website: Official website

Powhatan High School is a public high school in Powhatan County, Virginia. It serves 1,328 students and is the only high school in the Powhatan County Public Schools system.

== History ==
Powhatan High School was housed in a number of different buildings in the 1900s. The building used from 1971 to 2003 was later used as Pocahontas Middle School from 2003 to 2016, and is now called Pocahontas Landmark Center and used as the school board office. The school was racially integrated in 1969. The current facility opened in 2003.

== Academics ==
Advanced Placement (AP) classes are offered at Powhatan High School, with 41% of students taking AP classes. PHS also offers dual enrollment classes in collaboration with J. Sargeant Reynolds Community College. Together, the two schools host an Advanced College Academy program, which allows students who participate to earn an associate's degree in social sciences and an advanced studies high school diploma upon graduation.

AP Classes offered include AP English 11 (Language & Composition), AP English 12 (Literature & Composition), AP English 10 (Seminar), AP Calculus AB, AP Statistics, AP Computer Science Principles, AP Computer Science A, AP Environmental Science, AP Biology, AP Chemistry, AP Physics 1, AP Physics C: Mechanics, AP Human Geography, AP World History: Modern, AP US History, AP US Government & Politics, AP Psychology, AP Spanish Language and Culture, AP 2-D Art and Design, AP 3-D Art and Design, and AP Drawing.

Dual Enrollment classes for students who are not enrolled in the ACA program include DE Math Analysis (MTH 167), DE English 12 (ENG 111, 112), and DE US Government (PLS 135, 136).

PHS offers career and technical education classes that provide students with experience in various job fields, including Veterinary Science, Business Marketing, Information Technology, Carpentry, Electricity, Culinary Arts, Cosmetology, Engineering, JROTC, Firefighting, Education, and Medical Sciences. Along with these CTE classes, Powhatan High School offers Cooperative Education Programs, allowing students to work at an approved job and earn high school credit for their work.

== Demographics and Enrollment ==
Racial and Ethnic Groups (Fall 2024)

- White – 83.4%
- Black – 5.9%
- Hispanic – 5.6%
- Multiple Races – 4.2%
- Asian – 0.6%
- American Indian – 0.3%
- Native Hawaiian – 0.1%

== Extracurriculars ==
- Mu Alpha Theta (Math Honor Society)
- National English Honor Society
- Science National Honor Society
- Tri-M Music Honor Society
- Spanish Honor Society
- Rho Kappa (Social Studies Honor Society)
- FBLA-PBL
- FFA
- SkillsUSA
- Indoor Drumline
- Marching band
- Winter Guard

== Performing Arts ==
Powhatan High School operates multiple curricular ensembles, including show choir, symphonic band, wind symphony, jazz band, and chamber orchestra. Extracurricular ensembles include indoor drumline, marching band and winter guard.

Powhatan has 2 indoor drumline ensembles, Powhatan JV Percussion (performing in Scholastic A Class) and Powhatan Varsity Percussion (performing in Scholastic Open Class). Powhatan Varsity Percussion competes nationally at the WGI World Championships.

In 2022, the school district was awarded with the Best Communities for Music Education designation from the NAMM foundation.

In 2023, the school's show choir performance "Radiance" received grand champion in the single-gender division at the New England Show Choir Showdown at Andover High School in Massachusetts.

In 2024, the school’s show choir group “Resonance” received their first grand champion title in the mixed division at the Martinsburg American Classic at Martinsburg High School in West Virginia.

== Athletics ==
Powhatan High School's athletic teams are named the Indians and have competed in the Virginia High School League's Dominion District since 2019. Previously, the teams competed in the Jefferson District.

The football team won state championships in 1996 and 2003.

The softball team has six state championships, and the baseball team won its first state championship in 2007.
