= Clover Hill High School =

Public high school in Virginia, US

Coordinates: 37°26′53.376″N 77°38′23.9172″W

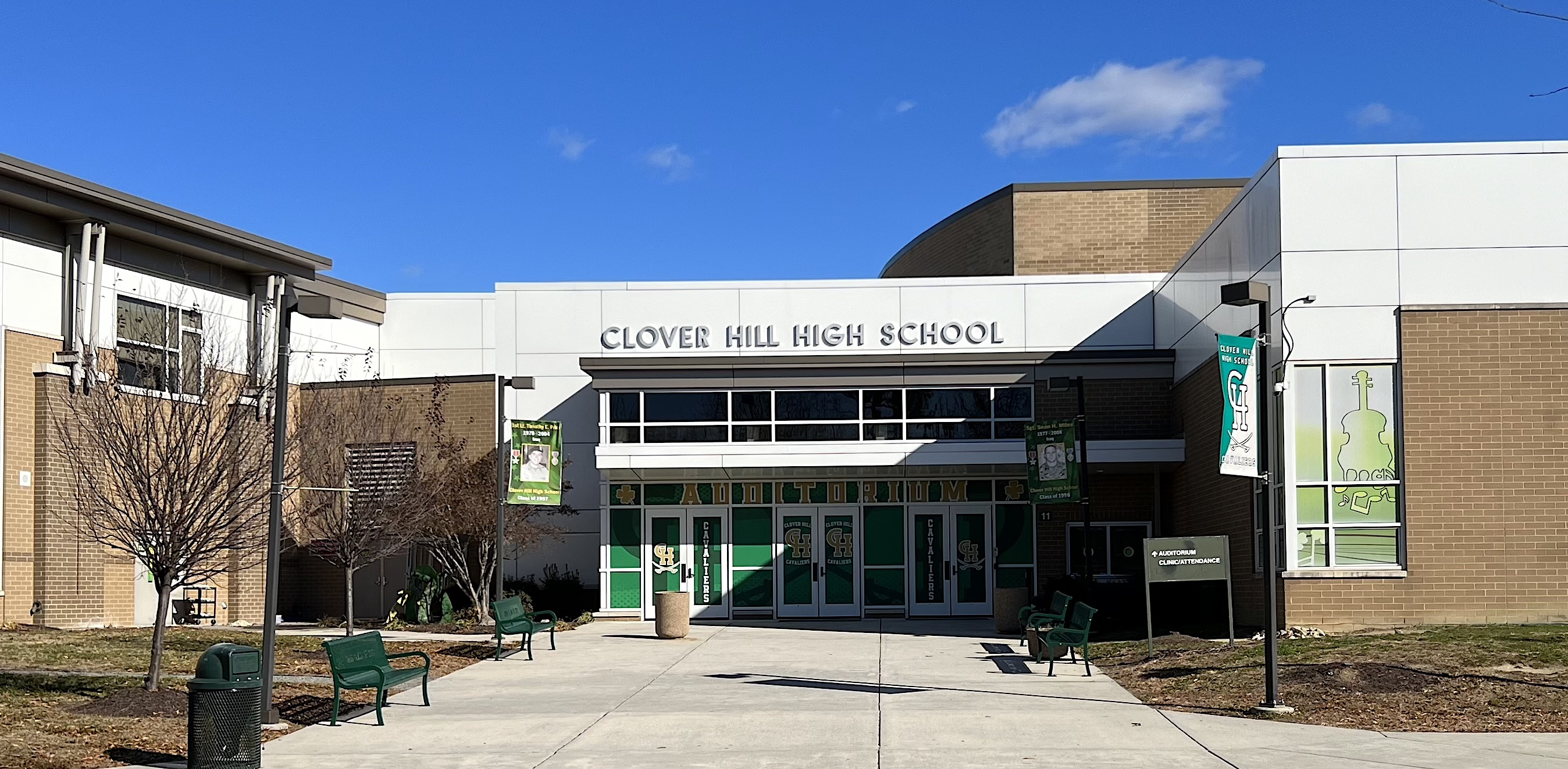
- The school in December 2023

Location
- 13301 Kelly Green Lane; Midlothian, Virginia 23112

Information
- School type: Public high school
- Founded: 1972
- School district: Chesterfield County Public Schools
- NCES District ID: 5100840
- Superintendent: John Murray
- NCES School ID: 510084000324
- Principal: David Altizer
- Teaching staff: 114.98 (on an FTE basis)
- Grades: 9–12
- Enrollment: 1,742 (2024–25)
- Student to teacher ratio: 15.15
- Language: English
- Campus: Suburban
- Colors: Green, Gold, White
- Athletics conference: Virginia High School League; AAA Central Region; AAA Dominion District
- Mascot: Cavalier
- Rival: Manchester High School Cosby High School
- Newspaper: Cavalier Chronicle
- Feeder schools: Bailey Bridge Middle School; Manchester Middle School; Swift Creek Middle School
- Specialty center: Mathematics and Science High School at Clover Hill
- Website: Official Site

Clover Hill High School is a public secondary school located in Midlothian, a suburb in Chesterfield County, Virginia. It is part of Chesterfield County Public Schools and is located at 13301 Kelly Green Lane. The school opened in 1972 and moved to its present location in 2010.

== Academics ==
Clover Hill houses the Chesterfield County Mathematics and Science High School, which opened in 1994.

Clover Hill's World Language department offers three different languages: French, Spanish, and Latin.

According to U.S. News & World Report, Clover Hill ranks 4,944th in America, 97th in Virginia, 13th in the Richmond Metro Area, and 3rd of the 11 high schools in CCPS. 38% of students participated in AP, and the graduation rate is 93%.

== Athletics ==
The school's sports teams compete in the Virginia High School League's AAA Dominion District. The school colors are green and gold, and the school's mascot is the Cavalier. In 2009, Clover Hill became the first high school to win three Virginia state championships in boys' volleyball. They also won championships in 2001 and 2005. In 2013 & 2014, the competition cheerleading team took home the conference 12 championships. They also competed at the regional level in 2013 & 2014.

== Overcrowding ==
Due to overcrowding at Clover Hill, a new high school, Cosby High School, opened in 2006 in the western part of the county. A new Clover Hill High School, located a bit farther east, opened in 2010 and has replaced the old CHHS. The old CHHS building houses "The Career and Technical Center at Hull Street Road."

== Notable alumni ==
- Brittany Lang – Professional golfer
- Bryan Tucker – Saturday Night Live writer
- Chantel Jones – Professional soccer player
- Doc Ish (real name: Sean McHugh) – music producer
- Kellee Santiago – Video game designer
- Randall Munroe – Webcomic artist (xkcd)
- Cory Smoot – Former guitarist for rock band GWAR
