= Chesterfield Court House, Virginia =

Unincorporated community in Virginia, United States

- Former census-designated place
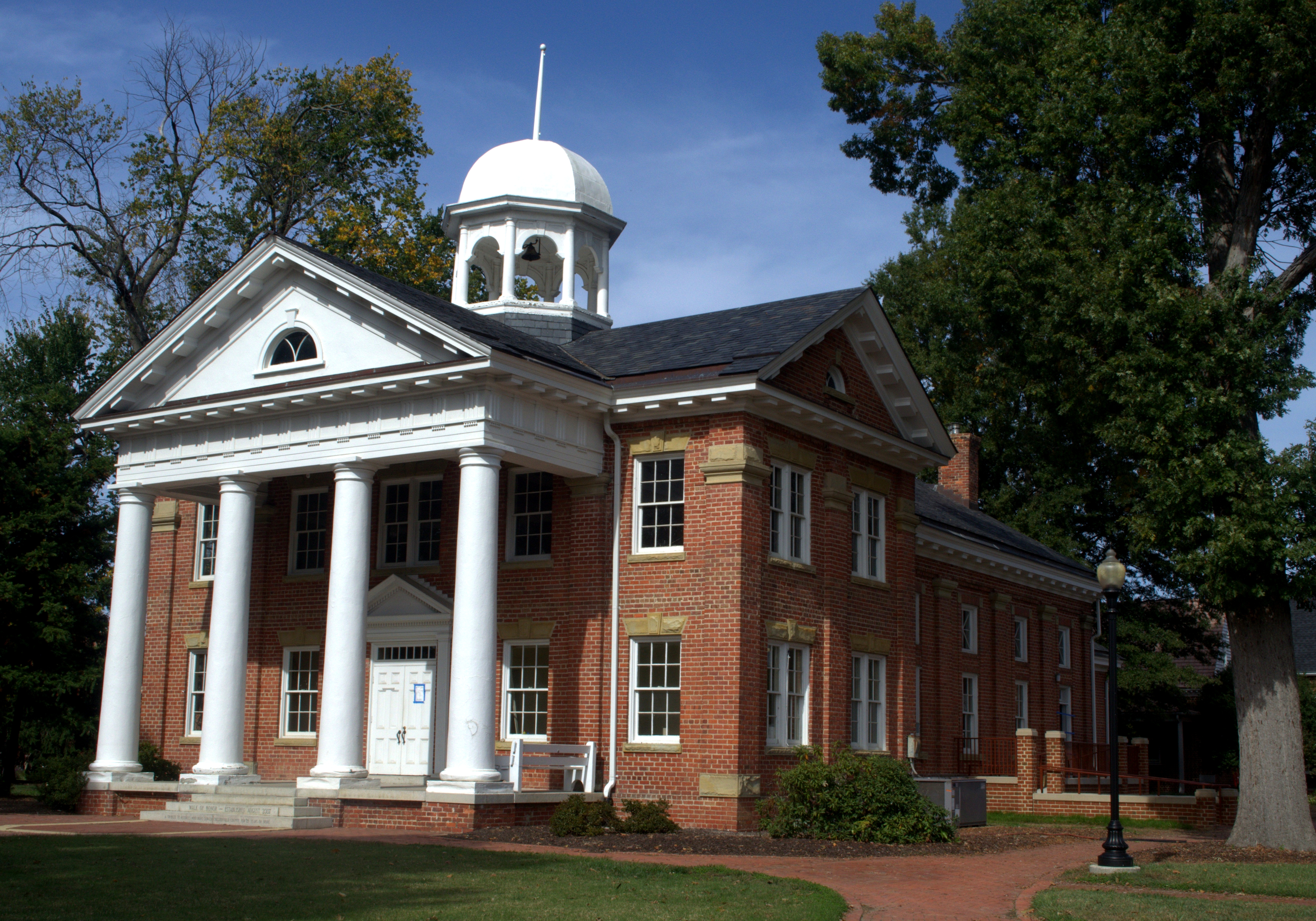
- Historic Chesterfield Courthouse at Courthouse Square

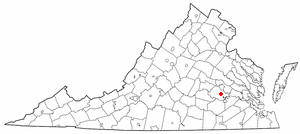
- Location of Chesterfield Court House, Virginia
- Coordinates: 37°22′38″N 77°30′18″W
- Country: United States
- State: Virginia
- County: Chesterfield

Area
  - Total: 2.3 sq mi (5.9 km^{2})
  - Land: 2.3 sq mi (5.9 km^{2})
  - Water: 0 sq mi (0.0 km^{2})
- Elevation: 200 ft (60 m)

Population (2000)
  - Total: 3,558
  - Density: 1,563/sq mi (603.5/km^{2})
- Time zone: UTC−5 (Eastern (EST))
  - Summer (DST): UTC−4 (EDT)
- ZIP Codes: 23832, 23838
- FIPS code: 51-16208
- GNIS feature ID: 1852915

Chesterfield Court House is an unincorporated community and former census-designated place that is the county seat of Chesterfield County, Virginia, United States. It was a census-designated place (CDP) at the 2000 census, but has not been delineated as a CDP since then. The Chesterfield County Courthouse and Courthouse Square are listed in the National Register of Historic Places. The area is also home of the Chesterfield County Government Complex.

== Geography ==
- Chesterfield County Courthouse and Courthouse Square
- U.S. National Register of Historic Places
- Location: N side VA 10, 350 ft. E of jct. with VA 655, Chesterfield, Virginia
- Area: 2 acres (0.81 ha)
- Built: 1828
- Architect: Vaughan Construction Co.
- Architectural style: Colonial Revival, Italianate, Federal
- NRHP reference No.: 92001008
- Added to NRHP: August 18, 1992

Chesterfield Court House is located at 37°22′35″N 77°30′14″W (37.376449, −77.503798).

According to the United States Census Bureau, the CDP had a total area of 2.3 square miles (6.0 km^{2}), all land.

== Demographics ==
Historical population
Census	Pop.	Note	%±
2000	3,558		—
U.S. Decennial Census; 2000 2010

Chesterfield Courthouse was first listed as a census designated place in the 2000 U.S. census; and was deleted prior to the 2010 U.S. census.

As of the census of 2000, there were 3,558 people, 1,139 households, and 775 families residing in the CDP. The population density was 1,563.0 people per square mile (602.5/km^{2}). There were 1,171 housing units at an average density of 514.4/sq mi (198.3/km^{2}). The racial makeup of the CDP was 70.24% White, 24.06% African American, 0.70% Native American, 1.46% Asian, 0.08% Pacific Islander, 1.55% from other races, and 1.91% from two or more races. Hispanic or Latino of any race were 3.49% of the population.

There were 1,139 households, out of which 37.0% had children under the age of 18 living with them, 47.4% were married couples living together, 16.9% had a female householder with no husband present, and 31.9% were non-families. 26.1% of all households were made up of individuals, and 4.4% had someone living alone who was 65 years of age or older. The average household size was 2.53 and the average family size was 3.06.

In the CDP the population was spread out, with 24.2% under the age of 18, 10.6% from 18 to 24, 33.4% from 25 to 44, 21.1% from 45 to 64, and 10.8% who were 65 years of age or older. The median age was 35 years. For every 100 females, there were 101.2 males. For every 100 females age 18 and over, there were 98.7 males.

The median income for a household in the CDP was $52,304, and the median income for a family was $60,246. Males had a median income of $37,765 versus $30,211 for females. The per capita income for the CDP was $19,125. About 2.4% of families and 5.2% of the population were below the poverty line, including 4.1% of those under age 18 and 9.6% of those age 65 or over.

== Notable people ==
- Denny Hamlin (b. 1980) – NASCAR driver
- Mark Parson (b. 1986) – former NFL cornerback for the Houston Texans and New Orleans Saints
- Young M.A (b. 1992) – rapper
- Devin Robinson (b. 1995) – NBA player for the Toronto Raptors
- Devin Druid (b. 1998) – actor best known for portraying Tyler Down in 13 Reasons Why
- Keldon Johnson (b. 1999) – NBA player for the San Antonio Spurs
- Howie DiSavino III (b. 2001) - NASCAR driver

== See also ==
- Chesterfield County Public Schools
