= Mathematics and Science High School at Clover Hill =

High school in Virginia, US

The Mathematics and Science High School at Clover Hill

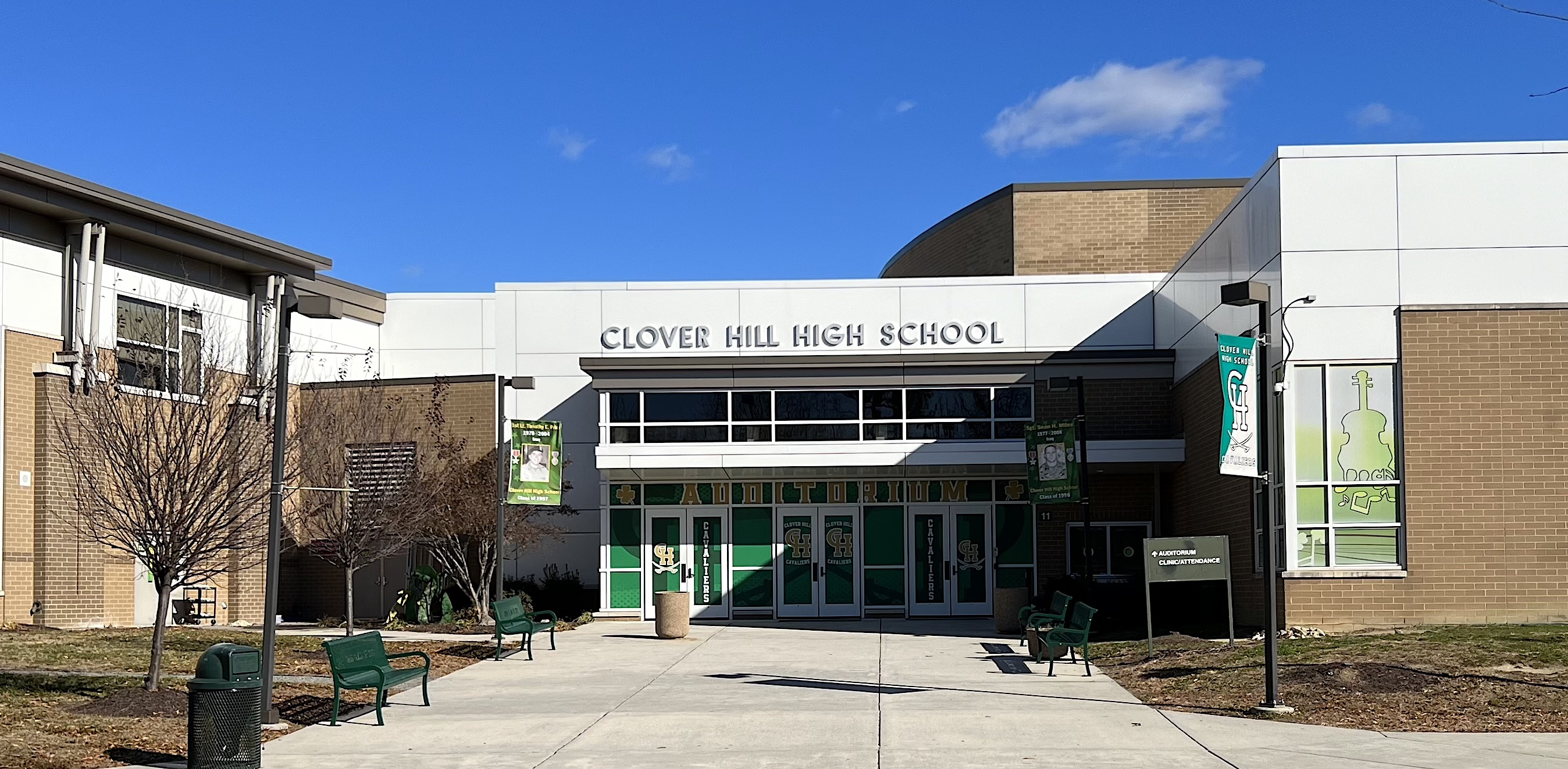
- Clover Hill High School, home to the "MathSci" Center

Location
- 13301 Kelly Green Lane; Midlothian, Virginia 23112; 37°26′53″N 77°38′23″W

Information
- School type: Magnet high school within Clover Hill High School
- Motto: Hodie Sequimur Cras Ducemus (Today we follow, tomorrow we lead.)
- Founded: 1994
- School district: Chesterfield County
- Superintendent: Mervin B Daugherty
- Grades: 9-12
- Enrollment: approx. 400 (100 accepted per class)
- Language: English
- Campus: Midlothian, VA
- Colors: Blue, Gold in addition to Clover Hill colors.
- Website: mathsci.info

The Chesterfield County Mathematics and Science High School at Clover Hill is a magnet school in Midlothian, Virginia. The school, which is on the campus of Clover Hill High School, opened in September 1994 to increase support for students who were being accelerated in math in middle schools across the county. In the early years, it was known as The Renaissance Program because its emphasis was on providing an advanced curriculum in math and science, without compromising coursework across other disciplines. By 1999, the school was widely regarded as a model for how a specialized curriculum program for gifted students can be successfully implemented.

In 1997, it was the only school in Virginia to have an experiment developed by students to be chosen as part of NASA's Space Experiment Module Program, to be launched into orbit on board the space shuttle Discovery.

The school is a member of the National Consortium for Specialized Secondary Schools of Mathematics, Science, and Technology (NCSSSMST).
