= Cosby High School =

Public high school in Virginia, US

Coordinates: 37°24′21.3″N 77°42′9.8″W

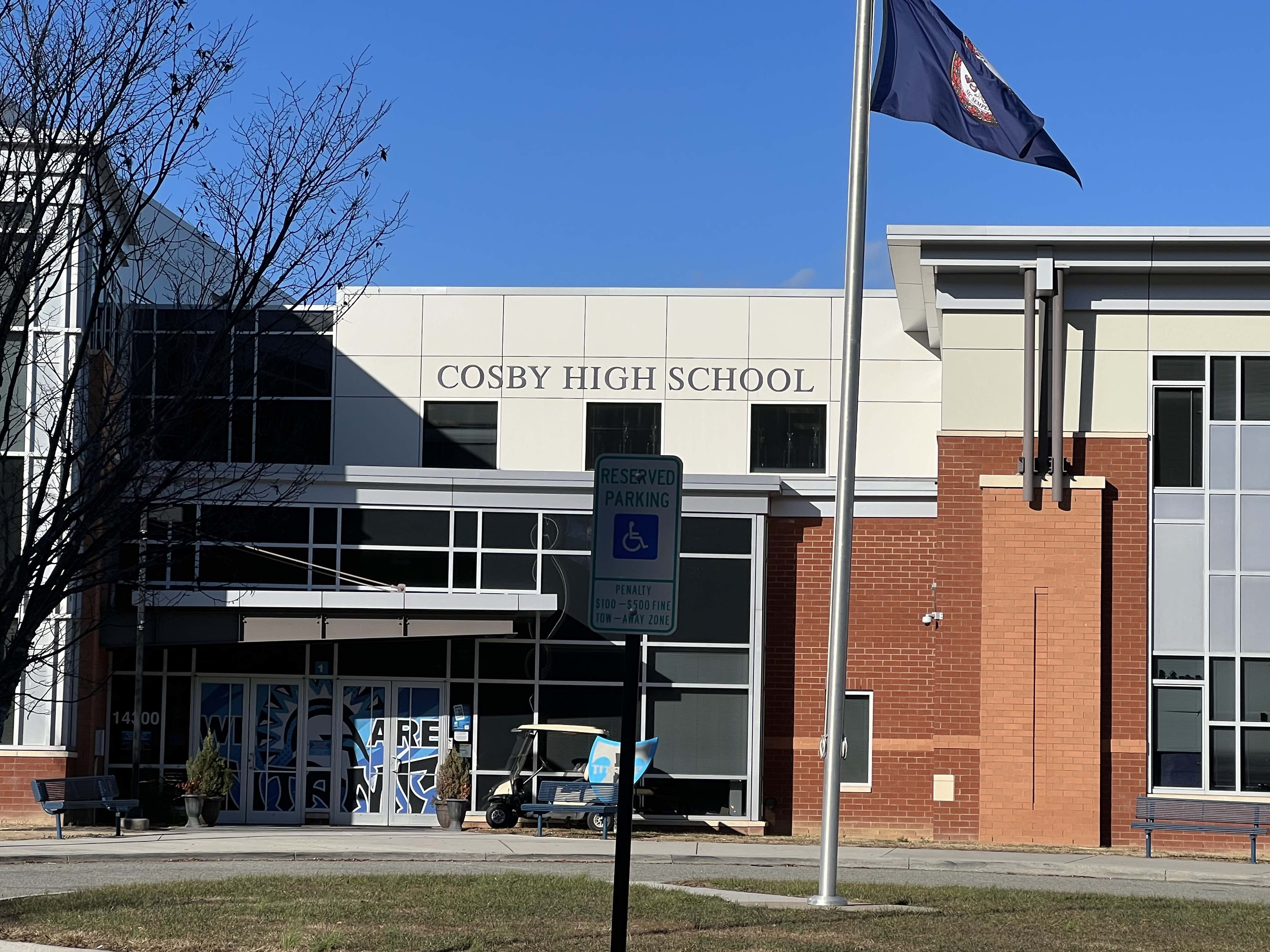

Location
- 14300 Fox Club Parkway; Midlothian, Virginia 23112

Information
- School type: Public high school
- Founded: 2006; 20 years ago
- School district: Chesterfield County Public Schools
- Superintendent: John Murray
- CEEB code: 470503
- NCES School ID: 510084002661
- Principal: Benjamin Snyder
- Teaching staff: 157.65 (FTE)
- Grades: 9–12
- Enrollment: 2,507 (2024–25)
- Student to teacher ratio: 15.90
- Language: English
- Campus: Suburban
- Colors: Columbia Blue, Silver, Black, White
- Athletics conference: Virginia High School League; AAA Central Region; AAA Dominion District
- Mascot: Titans
- Rival: Clover Hill High School; Midlothian High School; James River High School
- Feeder schools: Bailey Bridge Middle School; Swift Creek Middle School; Tomahawk Creek Middle School
- Specialty center: Health Science
- Website: Official Site

Cosby High School is a public high school in Midlothian, Virginia, United States. Cosby opened in 2006 and is the newest of eleven high schools administered by Chesterfield County Public Schools. The school serves over 2,500 students.

== History ==
Cosby High School was named for its proximity to Cosby Road. Once a major road through the county, it is now only about a mile long, running parallel to the more heavily trafficked Hull Street Road (US 360). The road's namesake, Wilson Dance Cosby, was a local resident who worked thirty-five years as a county school bus driver. In 2015, Cosby was named a National Blue Ribbon School.

== Academics ==
Cosby's Health Science Specialty Center opened in September 2007.

According to U.S. News & World Report, Cosby ranks #2,134th in America, 46th in Virginia, 8th in the Richmond Metro Area, and 2nd of the 11 high schools in Chesterfield County Public Schools. 47% of students participated in an AP course, and the graduation rate is 99%.

== Athletics ==
Cosby High School is a member of group AAA in the Virginia High School League. They are a part of the AAA Central Region and AAA Dominion District. In 2012, 2018, & 2019, they won the Wells Fargo Cup, which honors the VHSL high school with the most prominent athletic department on the state level.

Cosby High School currently does not have a rowing team, unlike their rival James River High School.

State Championships
Sport	Year(s)
Basketball (girls)	2014, 2015, 2016, 2018
Cheer	2010, 2011
Soccer (boys)	2018, 2024
Soccer (girls)	2012
Softball	2012, 2021
Sportsmanship (girls)	2013–14
Track and field (girls, indoor)	2012
Volleyball (boys)	2017, 2026
Wells Fargo Cup	2011–12, 2017–18, 2018–19
Crew	N/A

== Cosby Dance Team ==
The Cosby High School Dance Team competes in regional dance competitions in Virginia. At the 2026 Kelly Green Invitational, hosted by Clover Hill High School, the team earned first place in Hip Hop, second place in Jazz, and first place in Large Group Pom. Cosby also recorded the highest Pom score of the competition and received the judges’ “Squeaky Clean Award” for its Pom routine. Based on its overall performance, the team was named Grand Champion of the invitational.

== Performing arts ==
The CHS Titan Marching Band has been named a Commonwealth of Virginia Honor Band in the past and is a 16-time consecutive holder of this title.

The school also has two competitive show choirs, the mixed-gender "Spotlight" and the all-female "Rhapsody".

== Notable people ==
Alumni

- Jake Lowery (2008), baseball player
- Terry Williams (2010), Canadian football player
- Luis Rendon (2012), soccer player
- Troy Caupain (2013), basketball player

Faculty

- Bryan Still, football player
