= Chesterfield County Public Schools =

School district in Virginia, US

Coordinates: 37°22′35.62″N 77°30′13.1″W

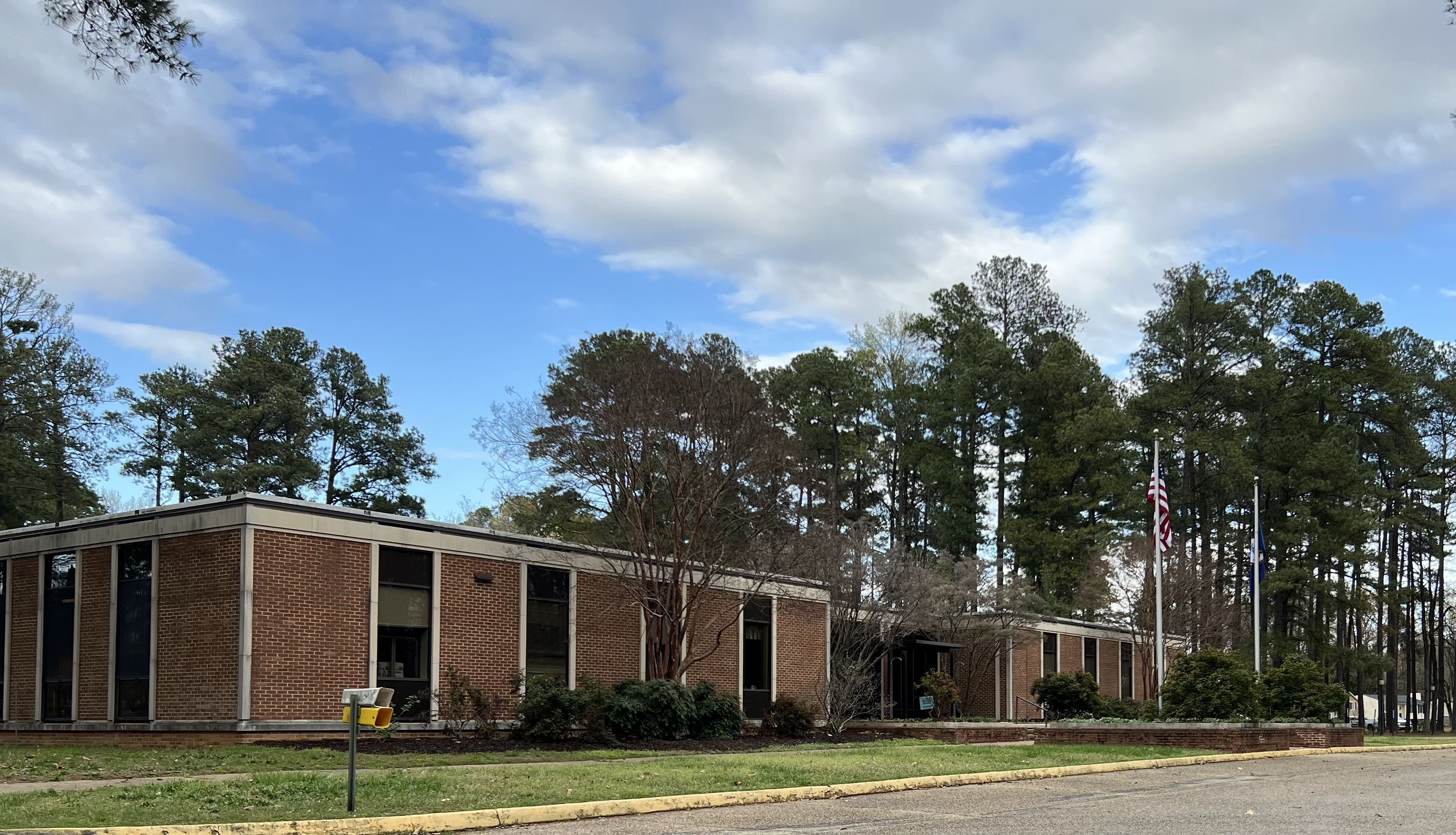
- Chesterfield County Public Schools central office, on Krause Road.

Address
- 9900 Krause Road Chesterfield, Virginia, 23832; United States

District information
- Type: Public
- Grades: PK–12
- Superintendent: John Murray
- School board: 5 members
- Chair of the board: Lisa M. Hudgins
- Schools: 67
- Budget: $1,000,000,000
- NCES District ID: 5100840

Students and staff
- Students: 64,194 (2024–25)
- Teachers: 4,740.81 (FTE)
- Staff: 7,942
- Student–teacher ratio: 13.54

Other information
- Website: oneccps.org

Chesterfield County Public Schools is the public school system of Chesterfield County, Virginia, United States. As of 2024, there are about 64,000 students enrolled in 67 schools. There are 41 elementary schools (grades K–5), 13 middle schools (grades 6–8), and 10 high schools (grades 9–12). Additionally, high school students can enroll in 13 specialty centers, two technical centers, one career academy, and two Governor's Schools.

== Leadership ==
=== Superintendent ===
The Superintendent of Chesterfield County Public Schools is Dr. John Murray, a CCPS graduate who attended Chalkley and Jacobs Road elementary schools, Manchester Middle School, and Manchester High School. Dr. Murray earned his bachelor’s degree from Longwood University.

=== School Board ===
There are five members of the Chesterfield County School Board, one for each of the five magisterial districts:

- Bermuda: Ann C. Coker
- Clover Hill: Jenna Darby (interim)
- Dale: Dominique R. Chatters
- Matoaca: Steven A. Paranto, vice chair
- Midlothian: Lisa Hudgins, chair

== Schools ==
=== Elementary schools ===
Name	Address	Image
Bellwood Elementary School	9536 Dawnshire Road, North Chesterfield, Virginia 23237	
Bensley Elementary School	6600 Strathmore Road, North Chesterfield, Virginia 23237	
Beulah Elementary School	5441 Beulah Road, North Chesterfield, Virginia 23237	
Bon Air Elementary School	8701 Polk Street, North Chesterfield, Virginia 23235	
J. A. Chalkley Elementary School	3301 Turner Road, Chesterfield, Virginia 23832	
Marguerite Christian Elementary School	14801 Woods Edge Road, South Chesterfield, Virginia 23834	
Clover Hill Elementary School	5700 Woodlake Village Parkway, Midlothian, Virginia 23112	
Crenshaw Elementary School	11901 Bailey Bridge Road, Midlothian, Virginia 23112	
Crestwood Elementary School	7600 Whittington Drive, North Chesterfield, Virginia 23235	
C. E. Curtis Elementary School	3600 West Hundred Road, Chester, Virginia 23831	
A. M. Davis Elementary School	415 S. Providence Road, Richmond, Virginia 23236	
Deep Creek Elementary School	5001 John Thomas Way, Moseley, Virginia 23120	
Ecoff Elementary School	5200 Ecoff Avenue, Chester, Virginia 23831	
Enon Elementary School	2001 E. Hundred Road, Chester, Virginia 23836	
Ettrick Elementary School	20910 Chesterfield Avenue, South Chesterfield, Virginia 23803	
Evergreen Elementary School	1701 E. Evergreen Parkway, Midlothian, Virginia 23114	
Falling Creek Elementary School	4800 Hopkins Road, North Chesterfield, Virginia 23234	
O. B. Gates Elementary School	10001 Courthouse Road, Chesterfield, Virginia 23832	
W. W. Gordon Elementary School	11701 Gordon School Road, North Chesterfield, Virginia 23236	
Grange Hall Elementary School	19301 Hull Street Road, Moseley, Virginia 23120	
Greenfield Elementary School	10751 Savoy Road, Richmond, Virginia 23235	
Harrowgate Elementary School	4000 Cougar Trail, Chester, Virginia 23831	
J. G. Hening Elementary School	5230 Chicora Drive, North Chesterfield, Virginia 23234	
Hopkins Elementary School	6000 Hopkins Road, North Chesterfield, Virginia 23234	
Jacobs Road Elementary School	8800 Jacobs Road, Chesterfield, Virginia 23832	
Matoaca Elementary School	20300 Halloway Avenue, South Chesterfield, Virginia 23803	
Moseley Elementary School	7100 Magnolia Green Parkway, Moseley, Virginia 23120	
Old Hundred Elementary School	1501 Old Hundred Road, Midlothian, Virginia 23114	
Providence Elementary School	11001 West Providence Road, North Chesterfield, Virginia 23236	
Reams Road Elementary School	10141 Reams Road, Richmond, Virginia 23236	
Robious Elementary School	2801 Robious Crossing Drive, Midlothian, Virginia 23113	
Salem Church Elementary School	9600 Salem Church Road, North Chesterfield, Virginia 23237	
Elizabeth Scott Elementary School	813 Beginners Trail Loop, Chester, Virginia 23836	
Alberta Smith Elementary School	13200 Bailey Bridge Road, Midlothian, Virginia 23112	
Spring Run Elementary School	13901 Spring Run Road, Midlothian, Virginia 23112	
Swift Creek Elementary School	13800 Genito Road, Midlothian, Virginia 23112	
J. B. Watkins Elementary School	501 Coalfield Road, Midlothian, Virginia 23114	
Bettie Weaver Elementary School	3600 James River Road, Midlothian, Virginia 23113	
C. C. Wells Elementary School	13101 South Chester Road, Chester, Virginia 23831	
Winterpock Elementary School	9000 Elementary Way Loop, Chesterfield, Virginia 23832	
Woolridge Elementary School	5401 Timberbluff Parkway, Midlothian, Virginia 23112	

=== Middle schools ===
Name	Address	Image
Bailey Bridge Middle School	12501 Bailey Bridge Road, Midlothian, Virginia 23112	
George W. Carver Middle School	3800 Cougar Trail, Chester, Virginia 23831	
Elizabeth Davis Middle School	601 Corvus Court, Chester, Virginia 23836	
Deep Creek Middle School	17151 Westerleigh Parkway, Moseley, Virginia 23120	
Falling Creek Middle School	4780 Hopkins Road, North Chesterfield, Virginia 23234	
Manchester Middle School	7401 Hull Street Road, North Chesterfield, Virginia 23235	
Matoaca Middle School	6001 Hickory Road, South Chesterfield, Virginia 23803	
Midlothian Middle School	13501 Midlothian Turnpike, Midlothian, Virginia 23113	
Providence Middle School	900 Starlight Lane, Richmond, Virginia 23235	
Robious Middle School	2701 Robious Crossing Drive, Midlothian, Virginia 23113	
Salem Church Middle School	9700 Salem Church Road, North Chesterfield, Virginia 23237	
Swift Creek Middle School	3700 Old Hundred Road, Midlothian, Virginia 23112	
Tomahawk Creek Middle School	1600 Learning Place Loop, Midlothian, Virginia 23114	

=== High schools ===
Students can apply to the hosted specialty centers across the country regardless of their zoned high schools.

To address growth in the western portion of the county, the district began construction on West Ridge High School in 2025. The 340,000-square-foot facility is expected to be completed in August 2027, making it the first new high school to open in Chesterfield County since Cosby High School in 2006.

Name	Address	Specialty center(s)	Image
Lloyd C. Bird High School	10301 Courthouse Road, Chesterfield, Virginia 23832	Governor's Academy for Engineering Studies	
Clover Hill High School	13301 Kelly Green Lane, Midlothian, Virginia 23112	Mathematics and Science High School at Clover Hill	
Cosby High School	14300 Fox Club Parkway, Midlothian, Virginia 23112	Governor's Academy for Health Science	
Thomas Dale High School	3626 W. Hundred Road, Chester, Virginia 23831 (main campus) 3900 W. Hundred Road, Chester, Virginia 23831 (west campus)	Visual and Performing Arts	(main campus) (west campus)
James River High School	3700 James River Road, Midlothian, Virginia 23113	Leadership and International Relations	
Manchester High School	12601 Bailey Bridge Road, Midlothian, Virginia 23112	Mass Communications Spanish Immersion	
Matoaca High School	17700 Longhouse Lane, Chesterfield, Virginia 23838	Innovative Technology	
Meadowbrook High School	4901 Cogbill Road, North Chesterfield, Virginia 23234	International Baccalaureate Meadowbrook Academy for Developing Entrepreneurs (MADE)	
Midlothian High School	401 Charter Colony Parkway, Midlothian, Virginia 23114	International Baccalaureate	
Monacan High School	11501 Smoketree Drive, North Chesterfield, Virginia 23236	Health Professions and Therapies Humanities	
West Ridge High School			(slated to open August 2027)

==== Technical centers ====
High school students may also take courses at the following technical centers:

Name	Address	Notes	Image
Career and Technical Center @ Courthouse Road	10101 Courthouse Road, North Chesterfield, Virginia 23832	Technical center serving students from all county high schools	
Career and Technical Center @ Hull Street Road	13900 Hull Street Road, Midlothian, Virginia 23112	Technical center serving students from all county high schools	
Carver College and Career Academy	12400 Branders Bridge Road, Chester, Virginia 23831	Home to the Culinary, Business, and Construction programs	

== Governor's schools ==
Chesterfield County students may apply to the following governor's schools:

- Appomattox Regional Governor's School for the Arts and Technology
- Maggie L. Walker Governor's School for Government and International Studies

== Secondary Advanced Course Offerings ==
CCPS offers Advanced Placement (AP) courses, Dual Enrollment (DE) courses from Brightpoint Community College, and International Baccalaureate (IB) courses at Midlothian and Meadowbrook high schools.
