= Midlothian High School (Virginia) =

Public high school in Virginia, US

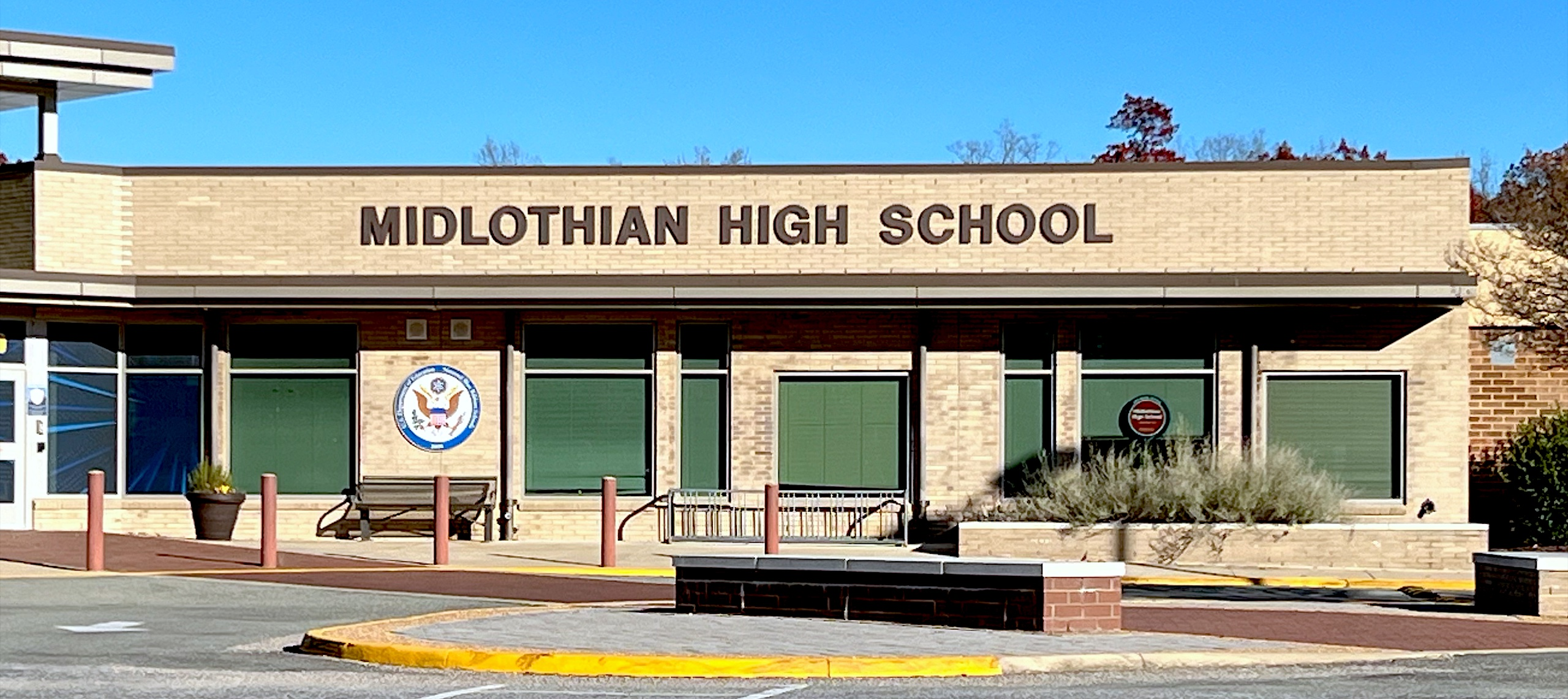
- Midlothian High School in 2023

Location
- 401 Charter Colony Parkway; Midlothian, Virginia 23114; 37°29′46.4″N 77°39′37.4″W

Information
- School type: Public high school
- Locale: Suburban, Large
- School district: Chesterfield County Public Schools
- NCES District ID: 5100840
- Superintendent: John Murray
- NCES School ID: 510084002006
- Principal: Shawn A. Abel
- Teaching staff: 128.88 (on an FTE basis)
- Grades: 9–12
- Enrollment: 2,048 (2024–25)
- Student to teacher ratio: 15.89
- Language: English
- Campus: Suburban
- Color
- Athletics conference: Virginia High School League; AAA Central Region; AAA Dominion District
- Mascot: Trojan
- Feeder schools: Midlothian Middle School; Tomahawk Creek Middle School
- Rival schools: James River High School, Cosby High School
- Specialty center: International Baccalaureate program (IB)
- Website: Official Site

Midlothian High School is in the Midlothian section of unincorporated Chesterfield County, Virginia, United States. Midlothian High School is one of ten secondary schools in Chesterfield County Public Schools.

== History ==
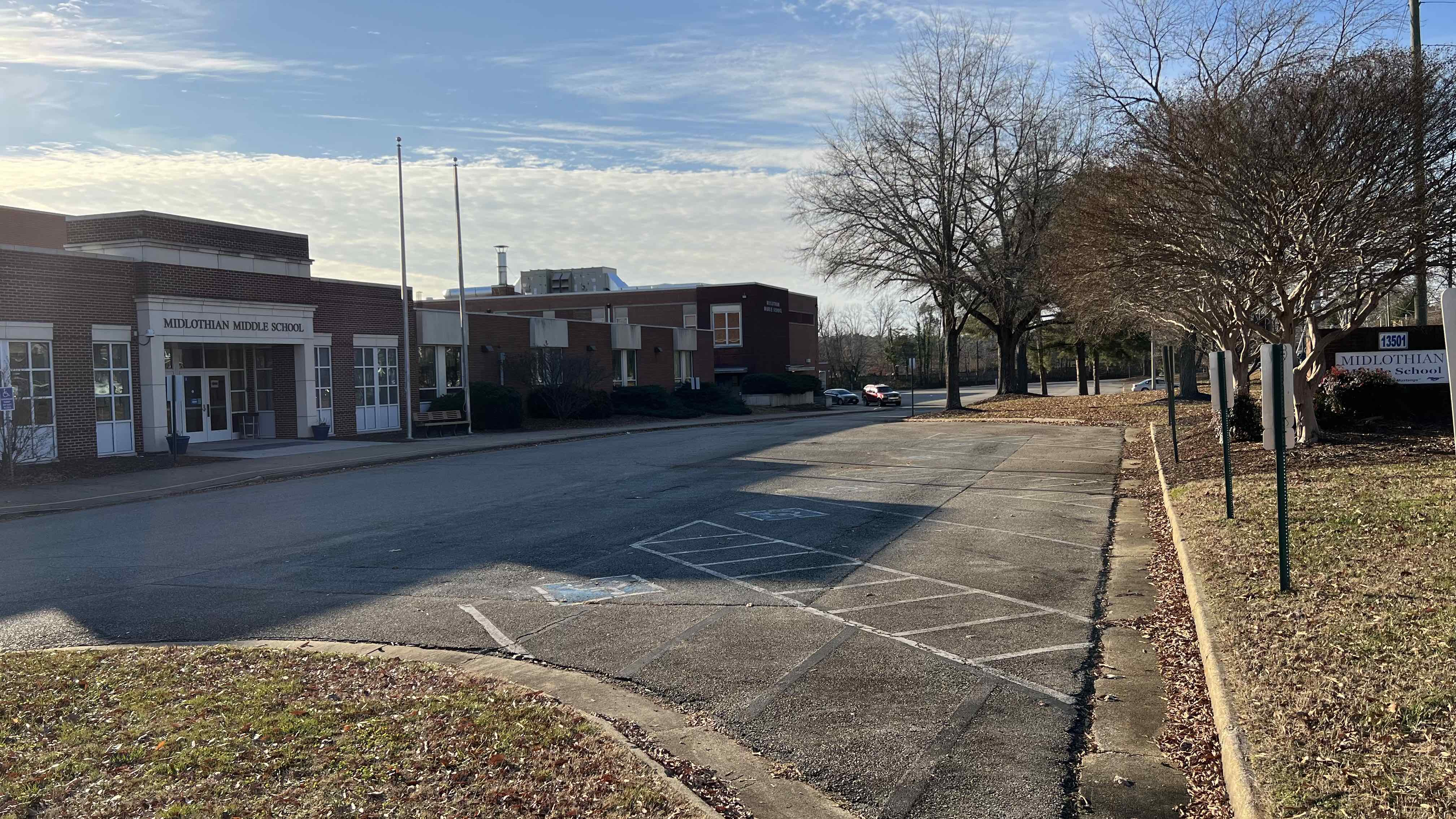
Midlothian Middle School, the original location for Midlothian High School

The original Midlothian High School was located on Route 60 (Midlothian Turnpike) in the village of Midlothian 14.1 miles west of Richmond, Virginia. The high school became accredited in 1924, graduating 3 students that year. A new high school located at 401 Charter Colony Parkway opened for the 1984–85 school year, leaving the original Midlothian High School to become Midlothian Middle School.

== Academics ==
Midlothian High School offers Advanced Placement (AP) courses, Dual Enrollment (DE) courses from Brightpoint Community College, and International Baccalaureate (IB) courses to its students.

The International Baccalaureate (IB) Program has been a specialty center at Midlothian High School since 2001. This program is one of the thirteen specialty centers in Chesterfield County. If accepted into the program, students are placed in honors/AP classes during their freshman and sophomore years in preparation for the more rigorous IB classes they will take in their junior and senior years.

== Notable alumni ==
- John Donley Adams, attorney, politician, 2017 Republican candidate for Attorney General of Virginia
- Richard Kelly, director and writer of Donnie Darko
- Chris LaCivita, political consultant
- Aimee Mann, singer, songwriter, member of rock group 'Til Tuesday
- Lucas Pope, video game developer, Papers, Please
- Dan Richards, professional wrestler
- Weegie Thompson, former professional football player, Pittsburgh Steelers
- Keith Howland, guitarist
