= AAA Central Region =

High school sports region in Virginia, US

The Central Region was one of the four AAA regions in the Virginia High School League until 2013. It was made up of four districts: the AAA Capital District, the AAA Central District, the AAA Colonial District, and the AAA Dominion District. Group AAA was the largest enrollment class for VHSL schools, and typically AAA is the most competitive level as well. In 2013, the three classification format was eliminated in favor of a six classification system. Accordingly, the Central Region was eliminated, while the districts were retained for regular season competition.

The Central Region comprises most of the public schools in the Greater Richmond Region, including public schools from Richmond City, Chesterfield County, Henrico County, Hanover County, Dinwiddie County and Prince George County as well as the independent cities of Colonial Heights, Hopewell and Petersburg.

== Classification Issue ==
Though AAA schools in Virginia are supposed to be around 1,500 students or larger, a considerable number of schools in the Central Region are below this size and petition to play up in Group AAA. In fact out of the 32 Central Region member schools, 13 are Group AA size, and one is Group A size. Usually, the VHSL accepts petitions from schools that choose to do this. While members that play up to AAA usually have enrollments close to the AA/AAA cutoff, schools such as Colonial Heights High School and Maggie L. Walker Governor's School in Richmond City enroll under 1,000 students. Indeed, Maggie Walker Governor's School is at around 600 and would be classified in Group A if they did not petition to play up.

The main reason why these schools play in AAA is to play with district schools that are nearby, rather than drive out farther away to play similarly sized schools. However, the region has enough AA sized members to create two AA districts (except for Maggie Walker) made up of smaller sized Central Region schools. Though it is not considered a "hot" issue at the moment, some VHSL officials are not particularly pleased with the fact that many schools in the Central Region that are small AA size or smaller continue to play up in AAA. This to some degree has caused Group AA to be the smallest group of the three classes (A schools tend to stay in Group A and not play up), and AAA to be the largest. This has also caused crowding in the AAA Eastern Region, which currently has 39 schools, only five of which have elected to play up.

== Member schools ==
AAA Capital District

- Patrick Henry High School of Ashland, Virginia
- Armstrong High School of Richmond, Virginia
- Atlee High School of Mechanicsville, Virginia
- Hanover High School of Mechanicsville, Virginia
- Henrico High School of Richmond, Virginia
- Highland Springs High School of Highland Springs, Virginia
- Mechanicsville High School of Mechanicsville, Virginia
- Varina High School of Richmond, Virginia

AAA Central District

- Colonial Heights High School of Colonial Heights, Virginia
- Thomas Dale High School of Chester, Virginia
- Dinwiddie County High School of Dinwiddie, Virginia
- Hopewell High School of Hopewell, Virginia
- Matoaca High School of Chesterfield, Virginia
- Meadowbrook High School of Richmond, Virginia
- Petersburg High School of Petersburg, Virginia
- Prince George High School of Prince George, Virginia

AAA Colonial District

- Deep Run High School of Glen Allen, Virginia
- Douglas S. Freeman High School of Richmond, Virginia
- Mills E. Godwin High School of Richmond, Virginia
- Glen Allen High School of Glen Allen, Virginia
- Hermitage High School of Richmond, Virginia
- Thomas Jefferson High School of Richmond, Virginia
- John Marshall High School of Richmond, Virginia
- John Randolph Tucker High School of Richmond, Virginia
- Maggie L. Walker High School of Richmond, Virginia

AAA Dominion District

- L. C. Bird High School of Chesterfield, Virginia
- Clover Hill High School of Midlothian, Virginia
- Cosby High School of Midlothian, Virginia
- Huguenot High School of Richmond, Virginia
- James River High School of Midlothian, Virginia
- Manchester High School of Midlothian, Virginia
- Midlothian High School of Midlothian, Virginia
- Monacan High School of Richmond, Virginia
- George Wythe High School of Richmond, Virginia
