= Matoaca High School =

Public high school in Virginia, US

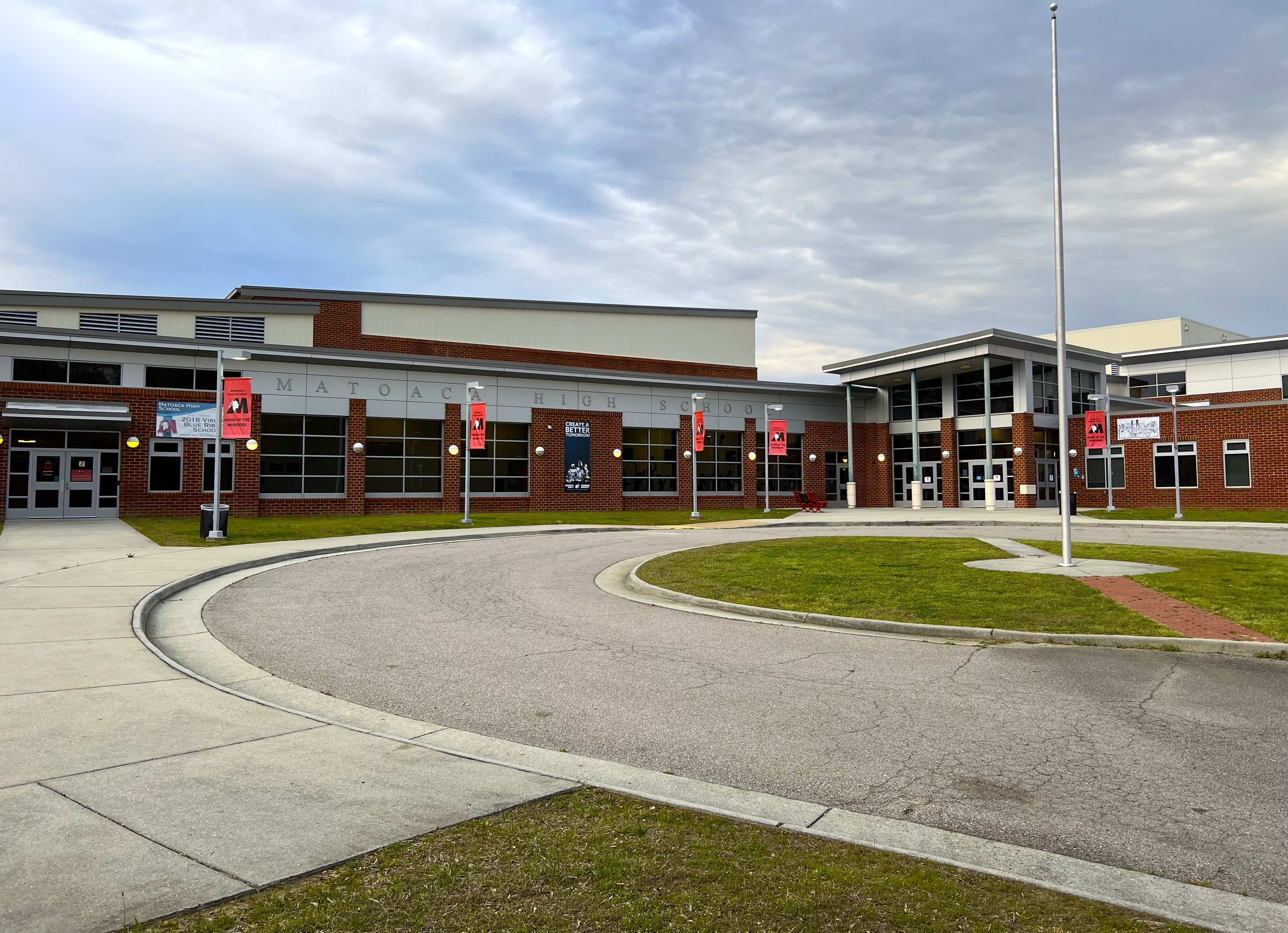

Location
- 17700 Longhouse Ln; Chesterfield, Virginia 23838

Information
- School type: Public, high school
- Founded: 1950
- Locale: Rural, Fringe
- School district: Chesterfield County Public Schools
- NCES District ID: 5100840
- Superintendent: John Murray
- NCES School ID: 510084000340
- Principal: Megan Rihn-Smith
- Teaching staff: 118.53 (on an FTE basis)
- Grades: 9–12
- Enrollment: 1,624 (2024–25)
  - Male: 877
  - Female: 747
- Student to teacher ratio: 13.70
- Colors: Red, white, and black
- Mascot: Warrior
- Rival: Thomas Dale High School
- Feeder schools: Bailey Bridge Middle School; George W. Carver Middle School; Matoaca Middle School
- Specialty center: Innovative Technology
- Athletic conference: Virginia High School League; Central Region; Central District
- Website: Official Site

Matoaca High School is a secondary school in the Matoaca community of unincorporated Chesterfield County, United States. This is the newer campus of the school; the old school campus was converted into a middle school, known currently as Matoaca Middle School. The school's mascot is the Warrior. Matoaca is well known for its sports and its technology specialty center.

This school has a technology specialty program for students to learn about the computer industry, through teaching classes such as Oracle I and II, Cisco, and IT1 and 2 (preparatory classes for Network+ and A+ certifications). Matoaca was formally the only school in Chesterfield County that distributed laptop computers for their students' use, but due to "students [failing] to show any academic gains compared with those in schools without laptops" the school discontinued their use for those not in the Specialty Center program.

The school's only campus is located at 17700 Longhouse Lane in Chesterfield. However, the older school located at 6001 Hickory Road was converted into Matoaca Middle School's East Campus in approximately 2002, where the CBG (Center Based Gifted) program and 8th graders are housed. The school's East Campus covers over 100 acres.

== Notable alumni ==
- Terrell Brown – CBS News correspondent
- James Farrior – former Pittsburgh Steelers middle linebacker
- Jennifer McClellan – Member of Congress, former state legislator
- Javaid Siddiqi – Virginia Secretary of Education under Bob McDonnell
- Sonya T. Smith – mechanical engineer at Howard University
