= John Randolph Tucker High School =

Public high school in Virginia, US

Coordinates: 37°37′48.7″N 77°32′48.7″W

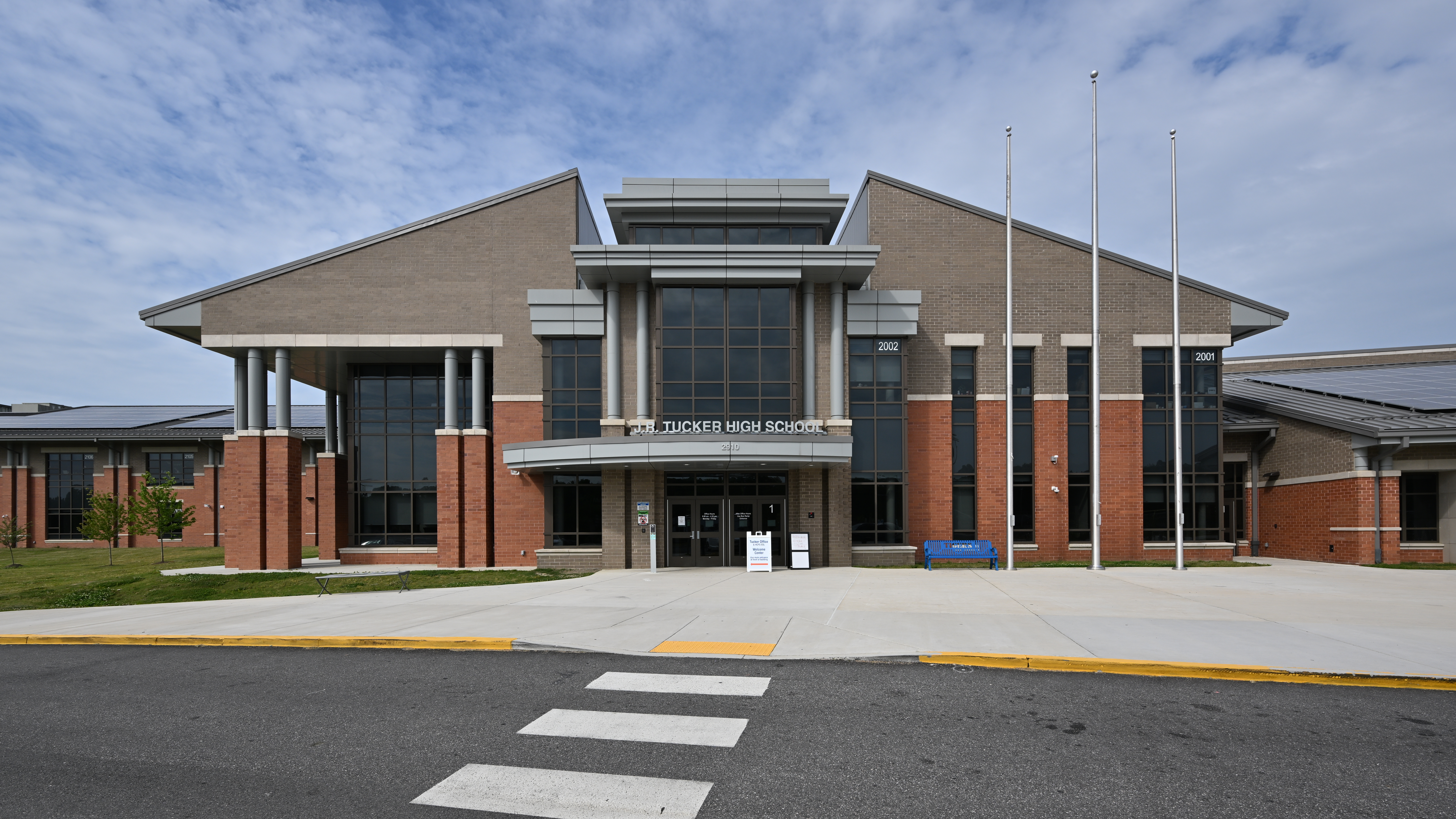

Location
- 2910 North Parham Road; Henrico, Virginia 23294; United States

Information
- School type: Public, High School
- Founded: 1962
- Locale: Suburban, Large
- School district: Henrico County Public Schools
- NCES District ID: 5101890
- Superintendent: Amy E. Cashwell
- NCES School ID: 510189000811
- Principal: Art Raymond
- Teaching staff: 113.70 (on an FTE basis)
- Grades: 9–12
- Enrollment: 2,132 (2024–25)
- Student to teacher ratio: 18.75
- Language: English
- Colors: Orange and blue
- Athletics conference: Virginia High School League; AAA Central Region; AAA Colonial District
- Mascot: Tiger
- Rival: Deep Run High School; Glen Allen High School; Hermitage High School
- Publication: The Hearing
- Newspaper: The Gavel
- Yearbook: The Witness
- Website: https://tucker.henricoschools.us/

John Randolph Tucker High School is a public high school in the West End of Henrico County, Virginia, United States. It is named after lawyer and judge John Randolph Tucker. Its students and faculty often refer to themselves as “Tigers," and locals often refer to the school as "Tucker." The school had approximately 2,100 students and more than 113 classroom teachers during the 2024–25 school year.

According to Niche, the school is the most diverse high school in Virginia as of 2026. It is also the high school In Virginia that produced the most governors, with Jim Gilmore and Abigail Spanberger both having graduated from the school.

== Specialty centers ==
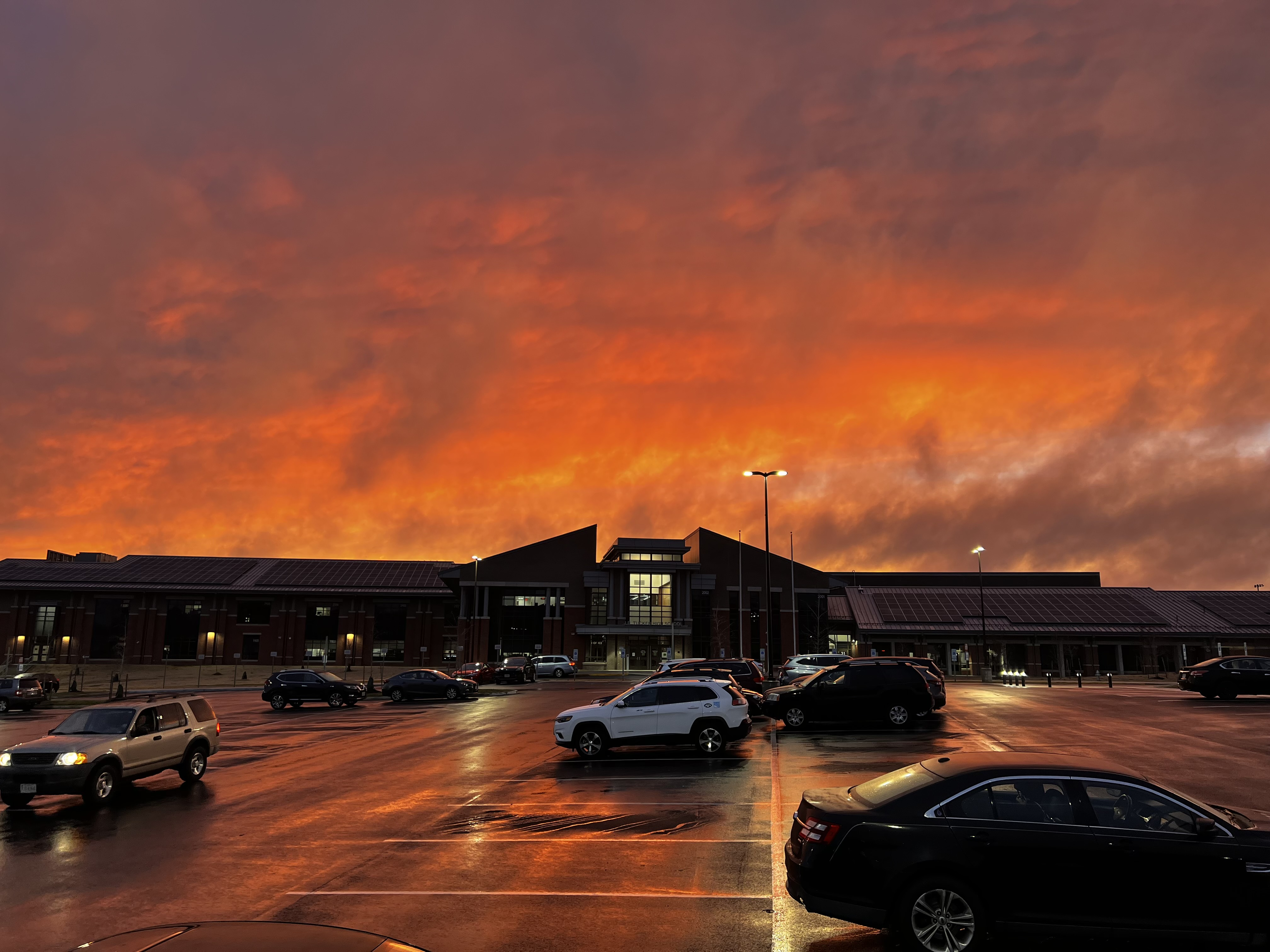
Sunset at J.R. Tucker High School

Of the nine comprehensive high schools in Henrico County, Tucker is the only one to host three specialty centers: Advanced College Academy, International Baccalaureate, and Spanish Language and Global Citizenship (commonly known as Immersion).

=== Advance College Academy ===
The Advance College Academy is designed for students within the program to earn an associate degree in social sciences from J. Sargeant Reynolds Community College (accredited by the Southern Association of Colleges and Schools) in addition to an advanced high school diploma from J. R. Tucker. The students are simultaneously enrolled in both institutions without cost. The program is founded on the standards of the National Alliance of Concurrent Enrollment Partnerships. The 60 college credits earned through the program are earned in the last two years of high school.

=== International Baccalaureate ===
The IB Program at J.R. Tucker was first authorized in the 2008–09 school year for the first class of ninth grade IB Middle Years Programme students and, two years later, expanded to include the diploma programs. Tucker's IB program is a member of the Mid-Atlantic Regional Conference of IB World Schools. Students at Tucker have to complete Creativity, Action, and Service projects throughout all four years of high school to explore their community and identity, a personal project in the summer after ninth grade to engage in creating a final product of the student's interests, and an extended essay—a university level paper under 4,000 words with a topic of choice—during 11th grade. The middle years certificate is awarded based on CAS projects in the ninth and 10th grade, meeting certain International Baccalaureate assessment scores in classes, and the personal project score. The International Baccalaureate Diploma requires doing well in CAS projects, International Baccalaureate assessments, and an extended essay.

=== Center for Spanish Language and Global Citizenship ===
The Center for Spanish Language and Global Citizenship was founded in the 1993-94 school year. Most immersion students have already had one year of study of Spanish. To apply, students should be prepared to take an entrance exam in addition to submitting their transcript and application essay. The program consists of continuing Spanish in immersive classes through high school, taking at least one year of a supplemental language, and opportunities such as studying abroad for credit, gaining entrance with guest speakers, field trips, and cultural events. The students take approximately two-to-three center classes in a seven block schedule, focusing on oral and written Spanish as well as the culture, literature and art of Spanish-speaking countries. Once the program is completed, a special seal is placed onto the graduating student's diploma.

== New school ==
A new J.R. Tucker High School, similar to Glen Allen High School, was built on the location of the former athletic fields and opened for the 2021–22 school year. The old school buildings were demolished and athletic fields built in their place.

== 2025 ICE detention ==
In August 2025, a student was arrested by Immigration and Customs Enforcement at the Henrico County Courthouse despite having a special visa given to him; he was there after facing felony driving charges, which were ultimately dropped to misdemeanor charges. After being held at the Farmville detention center for two months, he was released in October 2025. He planned to return to school.

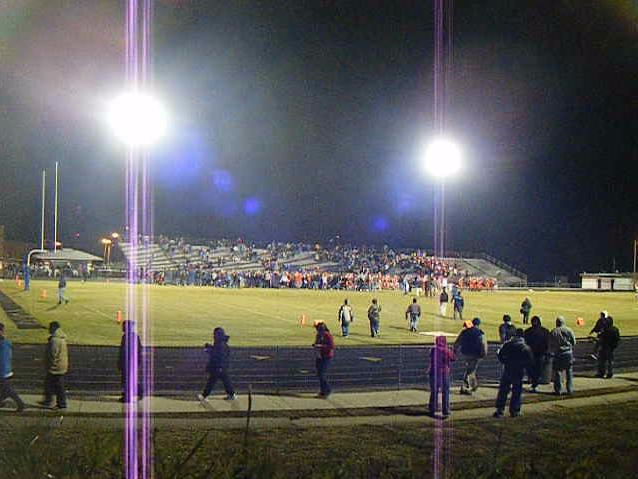
After the Patrick Henry game at the old Wells Stadium in 2009, fans and players celebrate on the field.

== Notable alumni ==
- Jim Gilmore, 68th Governor of Virginia and candidate in the 2008 and 2016 presidential primaries
- Tim Legler, ESPN analyst and former basketball player.
- Debbie Matenopoulos, American TV personality
- Mike Milchin, MLB player (Minnesota Twins, Baltimore Orioles)
- Amir Sadollah, professional mixed martial artist, won The Ultimate Fighter 7, UFC welterweight
- Mac Scarce, MLB player (Philadelphia Phillies, Minnesota Twins)
- Michael S. Schmidt, journalist
- Abigail Spanberger, former U.S. Representative for Virginia's 7th District, 75th Governor of Virginia
- Rick Wagoner, chairman and CEO of General Motors
- Ross Monroe Winter, violinist
- David Owen, former representative of Virginia's 57th district
