= Church Run =

Residential neighborhood in Virginia, US

Coordinates: 37.638946°N 77.596079°W

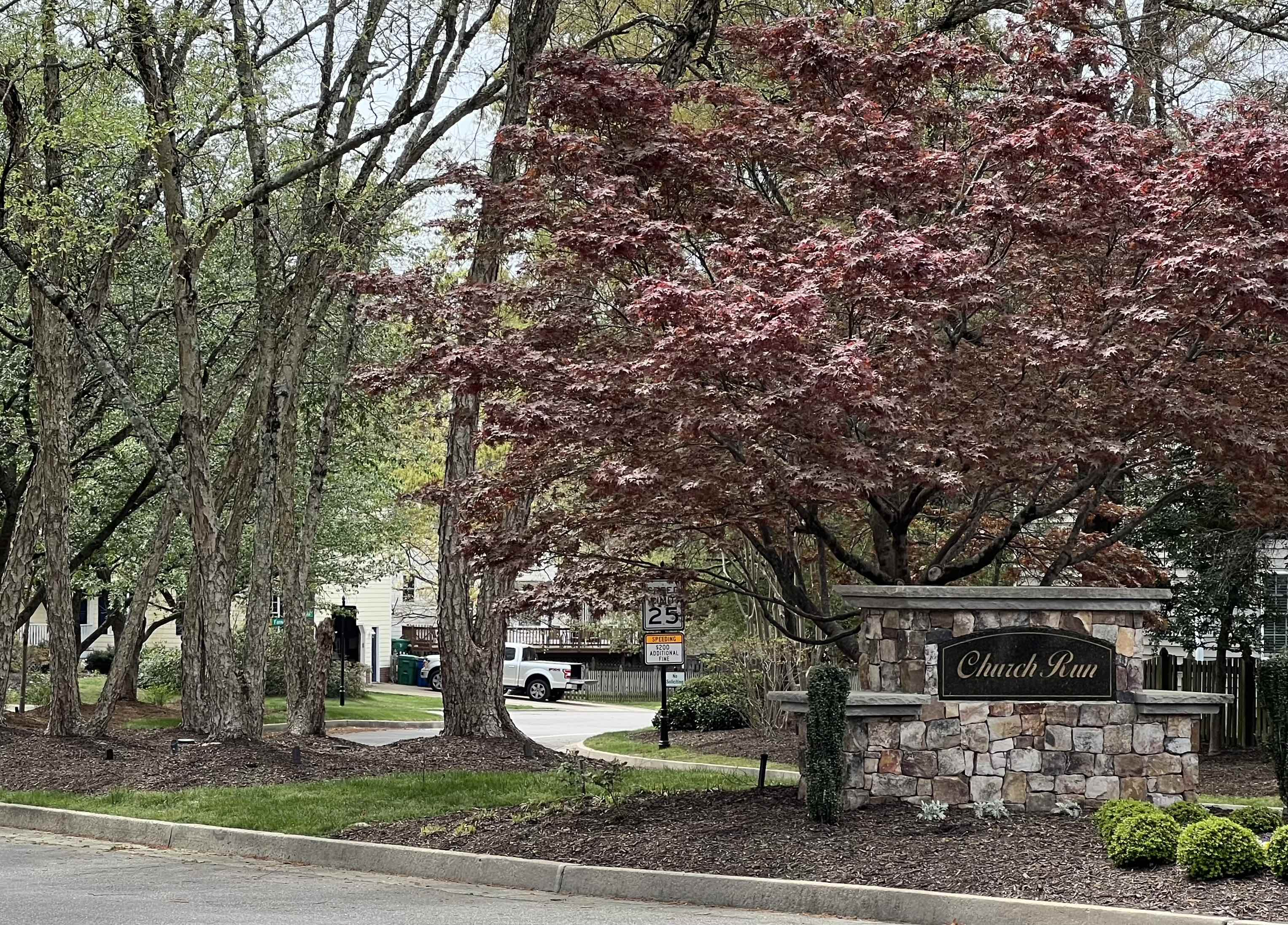
Entrance to the neighborhood from Three Chopt Road.

Church Run is a residential neighborhood in Henrico County, Virginia, that was built at the beginning of the 1990s. Church Run can be accessed by two entry points: one entry point is off of Church Road, and one is off of Three Chopt Road, between Cox Road and John Rolfe Pkwy.

== Church Run Athletics ==
Church Run and the surrounding neighborhoods join together in the summer to make the Church Run Rockets Swim Team. Church Run Rockets swim team started in 1991. Since then the team has been very successful. In 2016, former Church Run Rocket Townley Haas won a gold medal at the Rio Olympics.

== Schools ==
Church Run feeds into Short Pump Elementary, Pocahontas Middle School, and Godwin High School.
