= Highland Springs High School =

Public school in Virginia, United States

Coordinates: 37°32′21.1″N 77°19′26.4″W

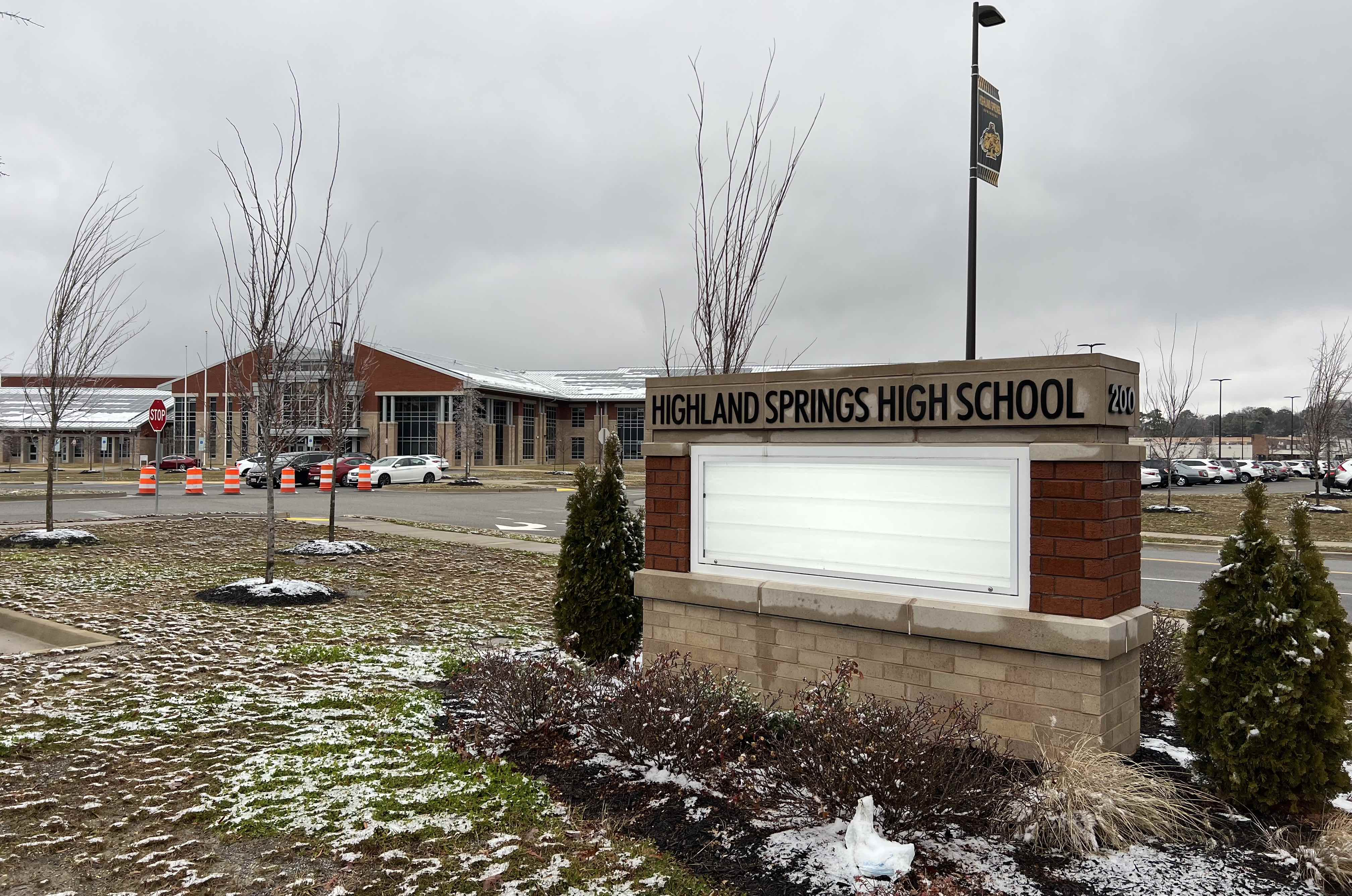

Location
- 200 S Airport Drive; Highland Springs, Virginia 23075

Information
- School type: Public, high school
- Founded: 1907
- School district: Henrico County Public Schools
- Superintendent: Amy Cashwell
- Principal: Ken White
- Staff: 110.99 (FTE)
- Grades: 9–12
- Enrollment: 1,917 (2018-19)
- Student to teacher ratio: 17.27
- Language: English
- Colors: Black, gold, and white
- Athletics conference: Virginia High School League; AAA Central Region; AAA Capital District
- Team name: Springers
- Website: Official site

Highland Springs High School is a public high school located in the East End of Henrico County, Virginia. It was one of the first high schools established in the Greater Richmond Region.

== Replacement school ==
After 70 years in its Oak Avenue facility, a new Highland Springs High School building opened for the 2021-22 school year. The new building replaced the original high school building with one built nearby. The project was part of a two-school replacement initiative by Henrico County Public Schools, which also opened a new J.R. Tucker High School for the 2021-22 school year. The two new schools cost about $100 million each. Both new schools were built on the football fields adjacent to their old buildings, and new football fields were constructed.

The old Highland Springs High School building — built in 1952 and renovated in 2008 — is being repurposed as the Oak Avenue Complex. "The Oak" will be HCPS' first full-service community school hub, part of a strategy to connect students and families with community services. It will add dedicated areas for a variety of academic and after-school programs and create a one-stop shop where students and families can connect with groups providing services they need.

== Notable alumni ==
- Jamar Abrams, professional basketball player
- Mekhi Becton, offensive guard for the Los Angeles Chargers
- Marcus Burley, former cornerback for 7 National Football League teams
- Ron Burton, former linebacker for the Dallas Cowboys, Phoenix Cardinals, and Los Angeles Raiders; currently the defensive line coach for Tulsa University
- Jim Davis, former defensive end in the National Football League and Canadian Football League
- Greg Dortch, wide receiver for the Arizona Cardinals
- Victor Harris, former safety in the National Football League and Canadian Football League
- Waddey Harvey, former defensive tackle for the Buffalo Bills
- Thomas Haskins, former running back for the Montreal Alouettes and Edmonton Eskimos
- Andre Ingram, former guard for the Los Angeles Lakers
- Buddy Lee, American Greco-Roman wrestler at the 1992 Summer Olympics
- Emanuel McNeil, former nose tackle in the National Football League and Canadian Football League
- Ed Perry, former tight end and long snapper for the Miami Dolphins and Kansas City Chiefs
- Brandon Rozzell, former professional basketball player for BC Luleå; played in college for the Virginia Commonwealth University Rams, currently the director of recruiting for Penn State Nittany Lions basketball
- Ricky Stokes, former men's basketball coach at Virginia Tech and East Carolina, currently associate commissioner of the Mid-American Conference
- Jay Threatt, professional basketball player for FC Porto; played in college for the Delaware State Hornets
- K'Von Wallace, American football safety
- Brian Washington, former safety for three National Football League teams
- Antwane Wells Jr., college football player
