= Colonial Heights High School =

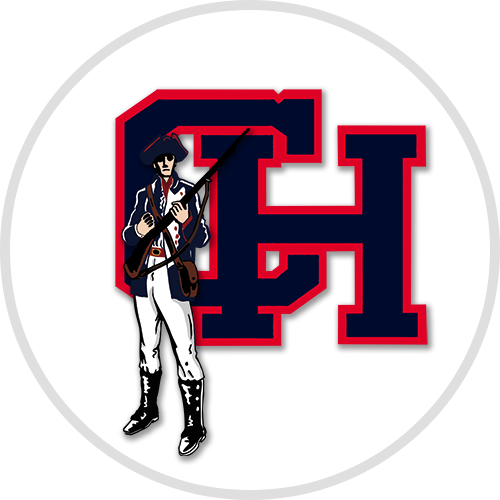

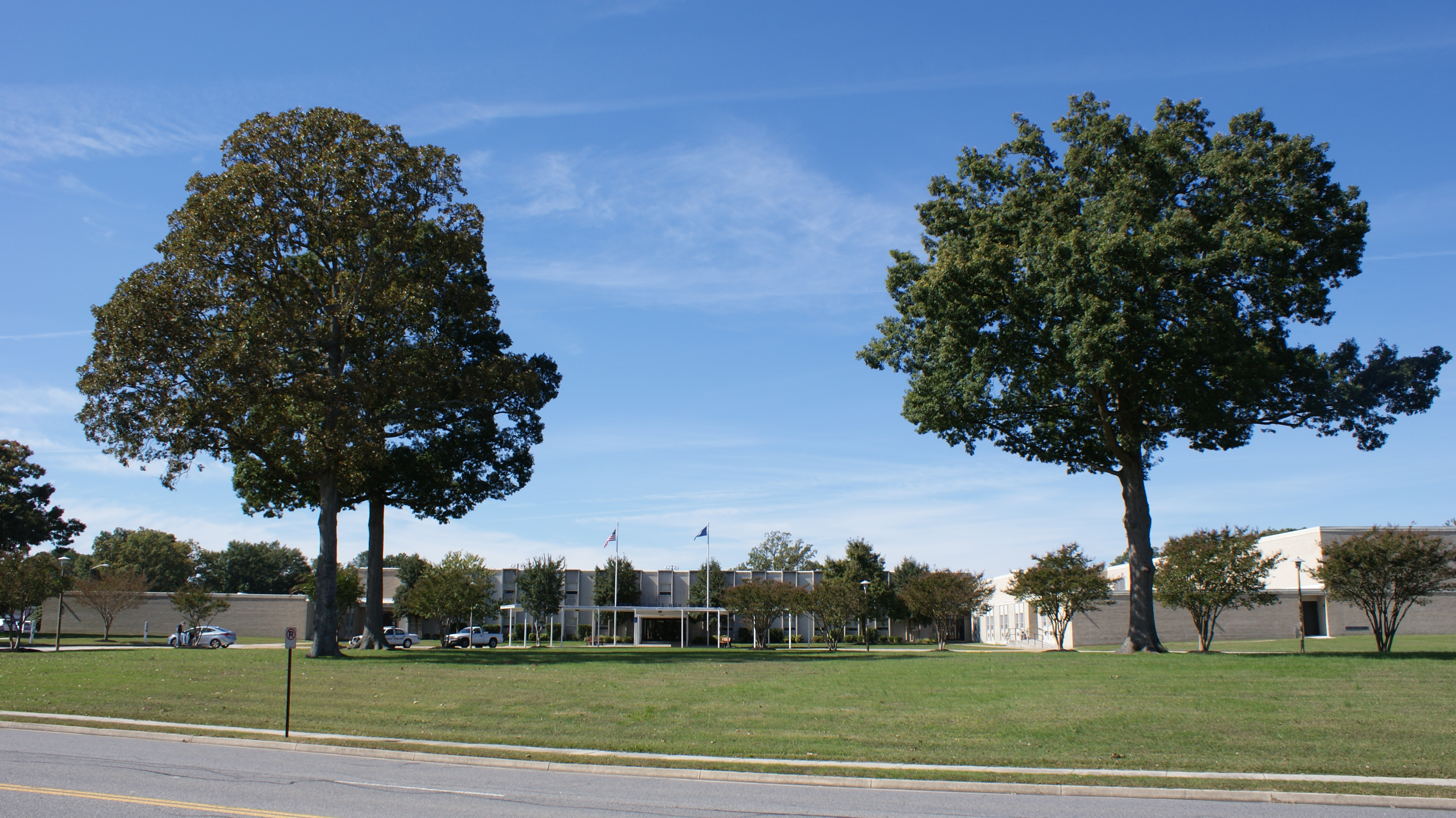

Location
- 3600 Conduit Road; Colonial Heights, Virginia 23834; United States
- Coordinates: 37°16′5.3″N 77°23′29.5″W

Information
- School type: Public, High school
- Established: 1957; 69 years ago
- School district: Colonial Heights Public Schools
- Superintendent: William Sroufe
- Principal: Mike Nelson
- Teaching staff: 76.69
- Grades: 9–12
- Enrollment: 833 (2020–21)
- Student to teacher ratio: 10.86
- Colors: Red; White; Navy blue
- Mascot: Minuteman
- Team name: Colonials
- Accreditation: Virginia Department of Education; Southern Association of Colleges and Schools
- Website: http://chhs.colonialhts.net

Colonial Heights High School (CHHS) is a public high school located in Colonial Heights, Virginia, United States. The school serves about 800 students grades 9 – 12. The high school includes a Technical Center which offers a variety of vocational education programs. CHHS is also currently an accredited high school in the state.

== Academics ==
CHHS ranks among the top 11,200 public high schools in America, 237th in Virginia, and 30th in the Richmond Metro Area. 12% of students participate in AP classes. The graduation rate is 87%.

== Sports ==
The Colonial Heights athletic teams are referred to as the Colonials. Their Athletic logos are a minuteman holding a Revolutionary War era musket. Colonials colors are Red, White, and Blue.

Formerly a member of the AAA Central District, and more recently a former member of 3A Conference 25 Eastern Region, the Colonial are now a member of Class 3 Region A. This region includes Hopewell, Lakeland, New Kent, I.C. Norcom, Park View (South Hill), Petersburg, Phoebus, Southampton, Tabb, B.T. Washington, York.

The Colonials' main rivals are the members of the AAA Central District: the Thomas Dale High School, Prince George High School, Matoaca High School, Petersburg High School, Hopewell High School, Meadowbrook High School.

== Music ==
The Colonial Heights marching band, the CHHS Marching Colonials, includes over 100 members. The band has traveled to places including Disney World, Cedar Point, New York, and many others. The band travels to many competitions during each season, but most notably (as well as most highly anticipated by members) the James Madison University Parade of Champions, hosted by JMU's Marching band, the JMU MRDs.

== Notable alumni ==
- Bob Taylor, former MLB player (San Francisco Giants)
- Kirk Cox, 55th Speaker of the Virginia House of Delegates
