= Henrico County Public Schools =

School system in Virginia

Coordinates: 37°32′36.1″N 77°22′55.67″W

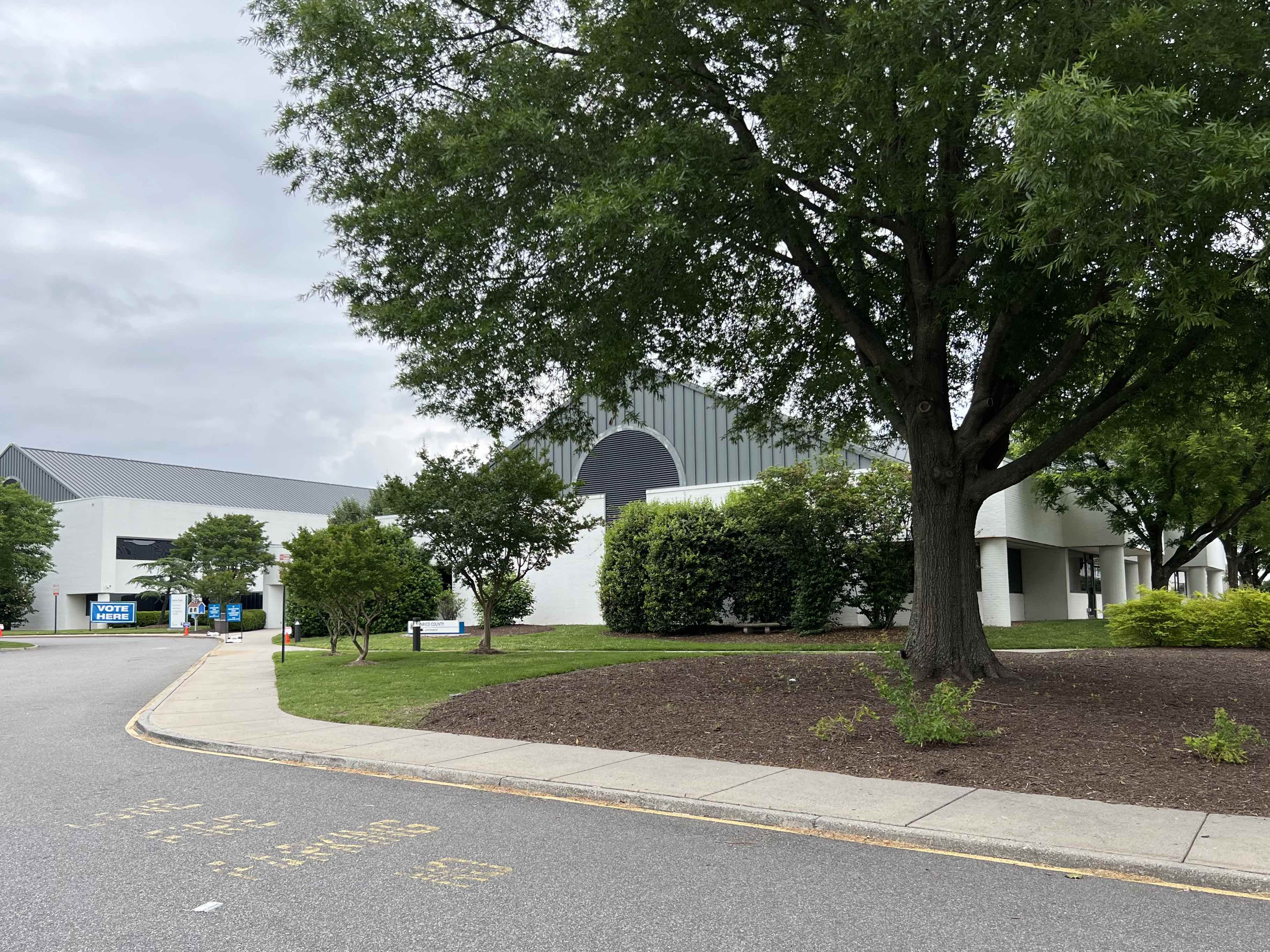
- Eastern Government Center, central office of HCPS.

Address
- 3820 Nine Mile Road Henrico County, Virginia, 23223; United States

District information
- Type: Public
- Motto: The right to achieve. The support to succeed.
- Superintendent: Amy E. Cashwell
- Schools: 79
- Budget: $762,900,000
- NCES District ID: 5101890

Students and staff
- Enrollment: 50,915 (2024–25)
- Teachers: 3,409.50 (on an FTE basis)
- Staff: 7,361
- Student–teacher ratio: 14.93
- Athletic conference: Capital District; Colonial District; Central Region

Other information
- Website: www.henricoschools.us

Henrico County Public Schools is a Virginia school division that operates as an independent branch of the Henrico County, Virginia county government and administers public schools in the county. Henrico County Public Schools has five International Baccalaureate schools—John Randolph Tucker High School, Henrico High School, Fairfield Middle School, Tuckahoe Middle School and George H. Moody Middle School.

== Statistics ==
=== District ===
There are 72 total schools and program centers. There are 46 elementary schools, 12 middle schools, 9 high schools, 3 Advanced Career Education Centers, 3 alternative program centers, and a virtual academy. Additional schools are being planned to be built as of March 2023. At the elementary level, the pupil/teacher ratio is 19.1, while at the high school level, the ratio is 18.3. There are 2,893 full-time equivalent (FTE) teachers in the district. The district had a budget of 762.9 million dollars in 2022–2023.

=== Students ===
There are 21,483 students at the elementary school level, 11,108 at the middle school level, and 15,798 at the high school level. 588 students are classified as attending other programs, leading to a total of 48,977. Of these students, 35.2% are African American, 33.5% are Caucasian, 13.2% are Asian, 12.5% are Hispanic, 5.2% are members of multiple races, and 0.4% are in the "other" category. In 2022, 90% of the students graduated on-time, and there were 3,716 graduates. 73% planned to continue their education, and 21.9 million dollars were awarded in scholarships. 44.9% of students were eligible for free and reduced-cost school meals.

== Leadership ==
=== Superintendent ===
Superintendent Dr. Amy E. Cashwell, former chief academic officer of the Virginia Beach City Public Schools, took office July 1, 2018, succeeding the retiring Dr. Patrick C. Kinlaw.

=== School Board ===
As of 2026, there are five members of the Henrico County School Board, one for each of the five magisterial districts:

- Brookland District: Kristi B. Kinsella
- Fairfield District: Ryan E. Young, Vice Chair
- Three Chopt District: Madison T. Irving, Chair
- Tuckahoe District: Marcie F. Shea
- Varina District: Alicia S. Atkins

== Pupil transportation ==
In Henrico as well as other places, one-room schoolhouses gradually evolved into elementary schools with multiple classrooms, separated by grade. The centralization of schools meant that children often lived too far away from the closest of these schools to walk as they had previously to the smaller schools.

Henrico began transportation of some children via farm wagons, and the program quickly grew. In 1933, Henrico County Public Schools began operating school buses. By 1960, the county was operating 118 buses, which had increased to 158 by 1964.

Fleet maintenance for all county and school board vehicles had been located at Dabb's House on Nine Mile Road and at a West End depot formerly located on the site now occupied by Regency Mall. Yet, in the early 1970s, maintenance operations were consolidated at a new facility on Woodman Road in the northern section of the county.

The Henrico school division is one of the larger school bus programs in Virginia and the United States. As of the 2021–22 school year, Henrico County Public Schools used a fleet of 627 school buses. Henrico County Public School buses make two to four runs into and out of schools every school day, transporting more than 28,000 students to school and bringing them home daily. Most buses are Type C "conventional" or Type D "transit" buses; bus models include the International FE, International RE, and the Thomas Saf-T-Liner HDX.

Currently, the bus system is divided into five areas: 1/East, 2/North, 3/Northwest, 4/West, and 5/Northeast. While most buses use ultra-low-sulfur diesel, 10 propane-powered buses are being piloted. The division attempts to replace buses at least every 13 years. During the 2023-2024 school year, the division used over a million gallons of diesel fuel for its buses alone, which traveled over 10 million miles.

== Technology ==
=== Laptop program ===
Henrico County Public Schools was one of the first school divisions in the U.S. to distribute laptop computers to students, during the 2001 school year. Indeed, the district was the first in the country to give a laptop to each high school student. Initially, the four-year, $18.6 million project was for high school students alone. However, the middle school program was also phased in 2002. Up until the 2005–06 school year, Apple computers were used exclusively. In 2005, Dell was awarded a contract with HCPS for high school students. Middle school students received Dell units at the beginning of the 2010–11 school year. In 2018, the school division partnered with Microsoft and Dell to bring Windows 10 and Dell Chromebooks to students.

Response to the laptop program has been mainly positive.

== Notable persons and accomplishments ==
Two local educators associated with Henrico County Public Schools became notable for contributions to the development of educational programs for African-American students in the late 19th and early to mid-20th Century.

=== Virginia Randolph ===
Virginia Randolph (1874–1958) became notable for her many years and contributions to the development of educational programs for African-American students during the days of segregated schools in Virginia. Educated at Richmond's Armstrong High School, in 1892, Randolph opened the Mountain Road School in the north-central part of the county. As a teacher there, she taught her students woodworking, sewing, cooking and gardening, as well as academics. In 1908, Henrico County Superintendent of Schools Jackson Davis named her to become the United States' first "Jeanes Supervising Industrial Teacher".

As the supervisor of 23 elementary schools in Henrico County, Virginia Randolph developed the first in-service training program for African American teachers and worked on improving the curriculum of the schools. With the freedom to design her own agenda, she shaped industrial work and community self-help programs to meet specific needs of schools. During her 57-year career, although she remained at work in Henrico County, she became recognized worldwide as a pioneering educator, humanitarian and leader, especially in the field of vocational education. She retired in 1949.

In Glen Allen, the Virginia Randolph Home Economics Cottage was made into a museum in memory of Randolph in 1970. The Virginia Historic Landmarks Commission designated the museum a State Historic Landmark. In 1976 the museum was named a National Historic Landmark by the United States Department of Interior, National Park Service. Randolph reportedly had an office in the building. Her grave site is on the grounds. Randolph is interred on the museum grounds. In modern times, the Academy at Virginia Randolph in Glen Allen, Virginia and a special education center are each named in her honor. The Virginia Randolph Foundation, formed in 1954, annually awards scholarships to Henrico County high school students who will be attending a four-year college or university.

=== Jackson T. Davis ===
Jackson T. Davis (1882–1947), a Richmonder, was a graduate of the College of William and Mary and Columbia University. He headed school divisions in Williamsburg and Marion before coming to Henrico as division superintendent in 1905. After his tenure at HCPS, Davis became state agent for African American rural schools for the Virginia State Department of Education from 1910 to 1915. He went on to also become an internationally known leader in his field. Henrico County's Jackson Davis Elementary School, dedicated in 1964, was named for him. His collection of photographs of Virginia's negro school facilities of the era is notable among many items of his career which were donated to the University of Virginia and are among the special collections there.

== Accolades ==
- In 2022, Henrico County Public Schools was named one of the "Best Communities for Music Education in America," earning this designation for the 22nd year in a row.
- Henrico County Public Schools named National School Library Program of the Year for 2011.(AASL)

== Specialty Centers ==
Henrico County Public Schools is notable for its specialty center programs. These programs feature advanced curriculums that are tailored to a specific field or subject, ranging from the medical sciences to the visual and performing arts. Programs may also provide special opportunities like internships, dual enrollment classes, culminating projects, etc. Students are required to submit an application in either 5th or 8th grade, with the exception of the Advanced Career Education programs that accept students in 10th and 11th grade. Students are also required take assessments on writing, reading, and math.

== Schools ==
=== High schools ===
Name	Address	Specialty center(s)	Image
Deep Run High School	4801 Twin Hickory Road, Glen Allen, Virginia 23059	Information Technology	
Douglas S. Freeman High School	8701 Three Chopt Road, Henrico, Virginia 23229	Leadership, Government and Global Economics	
Glen Allen High School	10700 Staples Mill Road, Glen Allen, Virginia 23060	Education and Human Development	
Mills E. Godwin High School	2101 Pump Road, Henrico, Virginia 23238	Medical Sciences	
Henrico High School	302 Azalea Avenue, Henrico, Virginia 23227	Arts Cybersecurity International Baccalaureate	
Hermitage High School	8301 Hungary Spring Road, Henrico, Virginia 23228	Advanced Career Education Allied Health and Human Services Humanities	
Highland Springs High School	200 S. Airport Drive, Highland Springs, Virginia 23075	Advance College Academy for Business Administration Advanced Career Education Engineering	
John Randolph Tucker High School	2910 N. Parham Road, Henrico, Virginia 23294	Advance College Academy for Social Sciences International Baccalaureate Spanish Language and Global Citizenship	
Varina High School	7053 Messer Road, Henrico, Virginia 23231	Communications and Media Relations Environmental Studies and Sustainability	

=== Middle schools ===
Name	Address	Specialty center	Image
Brookland Middle School	9200 Lydell Drive, Henrico, Virginia 23228		
Elko Middle School	5901 Elko Road, Sandston, Virginia 23150		
Fairfield Middle School	5121 Nine Mile Road, Henrico, Virginia 23223	International Baccalaureate	
Holman Middle School	600 Concourse Boulevard, Glen Allen, Virginia 23059		
Hungary Creek Middle School	4909 Francistown Road, Glen Allen, Virginia 23060		
George H. Moody Middle School	7800 Woodman Road, Henrico, Virginia 23228	International Baccalaureate	
Pocahontas Middle School	12000 Three Chopt Road, Henrico, Virginia 23233		
Quioccasin Middle School (formerly Harry F. Byrd Middle School)	9400 Quioccasin Road, Henrico, Virginia 23238	Innovation (expected August 2026)	
John Rolfe Middle School	6901 Messer Road, Henrico, Virginia 23231	Innovation	
Short Pump Middle School	4701 Pouncey Tract Road, Glen Allen, Virginia 23059		
Tuckahoe Middle School	9000 Three Chopt Road, Henrico, Virginia 23229	International Baccalaureate	
L. Douglas Wilder Middle School	6900 Wilkinson Road, Henrico, Virginia 23227	Gifted Young Scholars Academy	

=== Elementary schools ===
Name	Address	Image
Jacob L. Adams Elementary School	600 S. Laburnum Avenue, Henrico, Virginia 23223	
Arthur R. Ashe Jr. Elementary School	1001 Cedar Fork Road, Henrico, Virginia 23223	
George F. Baker Elementary School	6651 Willson Road, Henrico, Virginia 23231	
Ruby F. Carver Elementary School	1801 Lauderdale Drive, Henrico, Virginia 23238	
Chamberlayne Elementary School	8200 St. Charles Road, Richmond, Virginia 23227	
Colonial Trail Elementary School	12101 Liesfeld Farm Drive, Glen Allen, Virginia 23059	
Crestview Elementary School	1901 Charles Street, Henrico, Virginia 23226	
Jackson Davis Elementary School	8801 Nesslewood Drive, Henrico, Virginia 23229	
Cashell Donahoe Elementary School	1801 Graves Road, Sandston, Virginia 23150	
Dumbarton Elementary School	9000 Hungary Spring Road, Henrico, Virginia 23228	
Echo Lake Elementary School	5200 Francistown Road, Glen Allen, Virginia 23060	
Fair Oaks Elementary School	201 Jennings Road, Highland Springs, Virginia 23075	
Gayton Elementary School	12481 Church Road, Henrico, Virginia 23233	
Glen Allen Elementary School	11101 Mill Road, Glen Allen, Virginia 23060	
Glen Lea Elementary School	3909 Austin Avenue, Henrico, Virginia 23222	
Greenwood Elementary School	10960 Greenwood Road, Glen Allen, Virginia 23059	
Harvie Elementary School	3401 Harvie Road, Henrico, Virginia 23223	
Highland Springs Elementary School	600 Pleasant Street, Highland Springs, Virginia 23075	
Elizabeth Holladay Elementary School	7300 Galaxie Road, Henrico, Virginia 23228	
Charles M. Johnson Elementary School	5600 Bethlehem Road, Henrico, Virginia 23230	
David A. Kaechele Elementary School	5680 Pouncey Tract Road, Glen Allen, Virginia 23059	
Laburnum Elementary School	500 Meriwether Avenue, Henrico, Virginia 23222	
Lakeside Elementary School	6700 Cedar Croft Street, Henrico, Virginia 23228	
R.C. Longan Elementary School	9200 Mapleview Avenue, Henrico, Virginia 23294	
Longdale Elementary School	9500 Norfolk Street, Glen Allen, Virginia 23060	
Maybeury Elementary School	901 Maybeury Drive, Henrico, Virginia 23229	
Anthony P. Mehfoud Elementary School (grades K-2)	8320 Buffin Road, Henrico, Virginia 23231	
Montrose Elementary School	2820 Williamsburg Road, Henrico, Virginia 23231	
Nuckols Farm Elementary School	12351 Graham Meadows Drive, Henrico, Virginia 23233	
Pemberton Elementary School	1400 Pemberton Road, Henrico, Virginia 23238	
Raymond B. Pinchbeck Elementary School	1275 Gaskins Road, Henrico, Virginia 23238	
Harold Macon Ratcliffe Elementary School	2901 Thalen Street, Henrico, Virginia 23223	
Ridge Elementary School	8910 Three Chopt Road, Henrico, Virginia 23229	
Rivers Edge Elementary School	11600 Holman Ridge Road, Glen Allen, Virginia 23059	
Sandston Elementary School	7 Naglee Avenue, Sandston, Virginia 23150	
Seven Pines Elementary School	301 Beulah Road, Sandston, Virginia 23150	
Shady Grove Elementary School	12200 Wyndham Lake Drive, Glen Allen, Virginia 23059	
Short Pump Elementary School	3425 Pump Road, Henrico, Virginia 23233	
Skipwith Elementary School	2401 Skipwith Road, Henrico, Virginia 23294	
Springfield Park Elementary School	4301 Fort McHenry Parkway, Glen Allen, Virginia 23060	
Three Chopt Elementary School	1600 Skipwith Road, Henrico, Virginia 23229	
Maude Trevvett Elementary School	2300 Trevvett Drive, Henrico, Virginia 23228	
Tuckahoe Elementary School	701 Forest Avenue, Henrico, Virginia 23229	
Twin Hickory Elementary School	4900 Twin Hickory Lake Drive, Glen Allen, Virginia 23059	
Varina Elementary School (grades 3-5)	2551 New Market Road, Henrico, Virginia 23231	
Henry Ward Elementary School	3400 Darbytown Road, Henrico, Virginia 23231	

=== Other ===
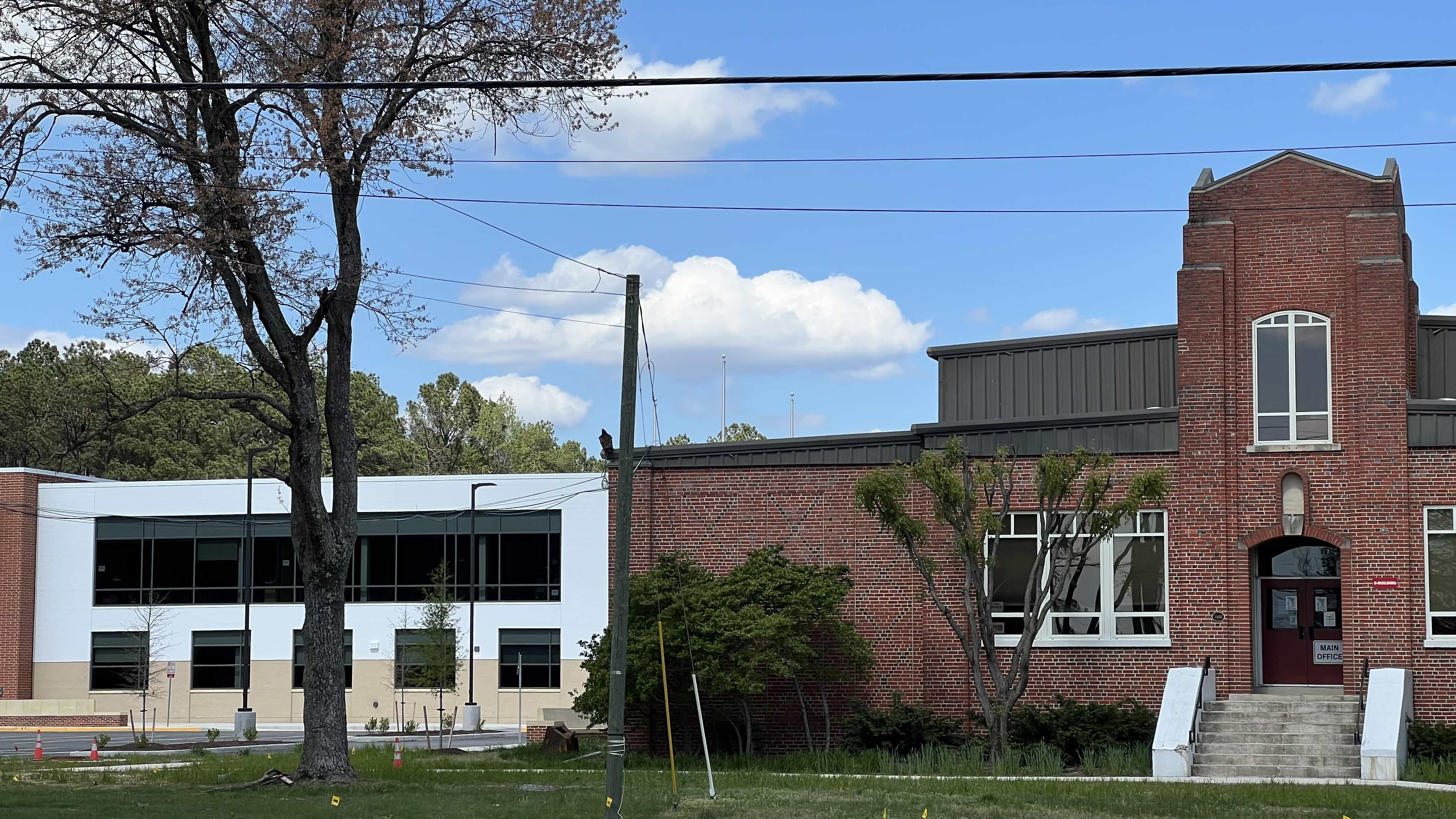
The Virginia Randolph site, where many alternative programs are located.

The division offers preschool programs at many sites, including an Early Learning Preschool at the New Bridge Learning Center.

The division operates two Adult Education Centers, one on Nine Mile Road and one at Regency Mall. The school division offers remedial classes to high school students at Highland Springs High School and Virginia Randolph. It offers the General Academic Program with transitions to the Individualized Student Alternative Education Plan (ISAEP) program at two sites. It also offers the Generating Recovery of Academic Direction Center at one site. HCPS operates the Virginia Randolph Education Center campus, which offers the Academy at Virginia Randolph and the Virginia Randolph Education Center. The division offers its Elementary Intervention Program at New Bridge Learning Center.

The division operates Henrico Virtual Academy, which closed its K-2 classroom in April 2026.

The county pays for students to be sent to two regional high schools: CodeRVA and Maggie Walker Governor's School.
