= Mills E. Godwin High School =

Coordinates: 37°37′11.6″N 77°36′17.8″W

Mills E. Godwin High School (Godwin High School)
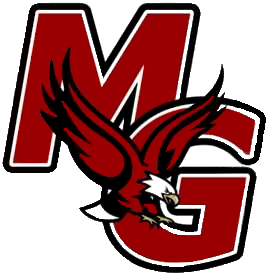

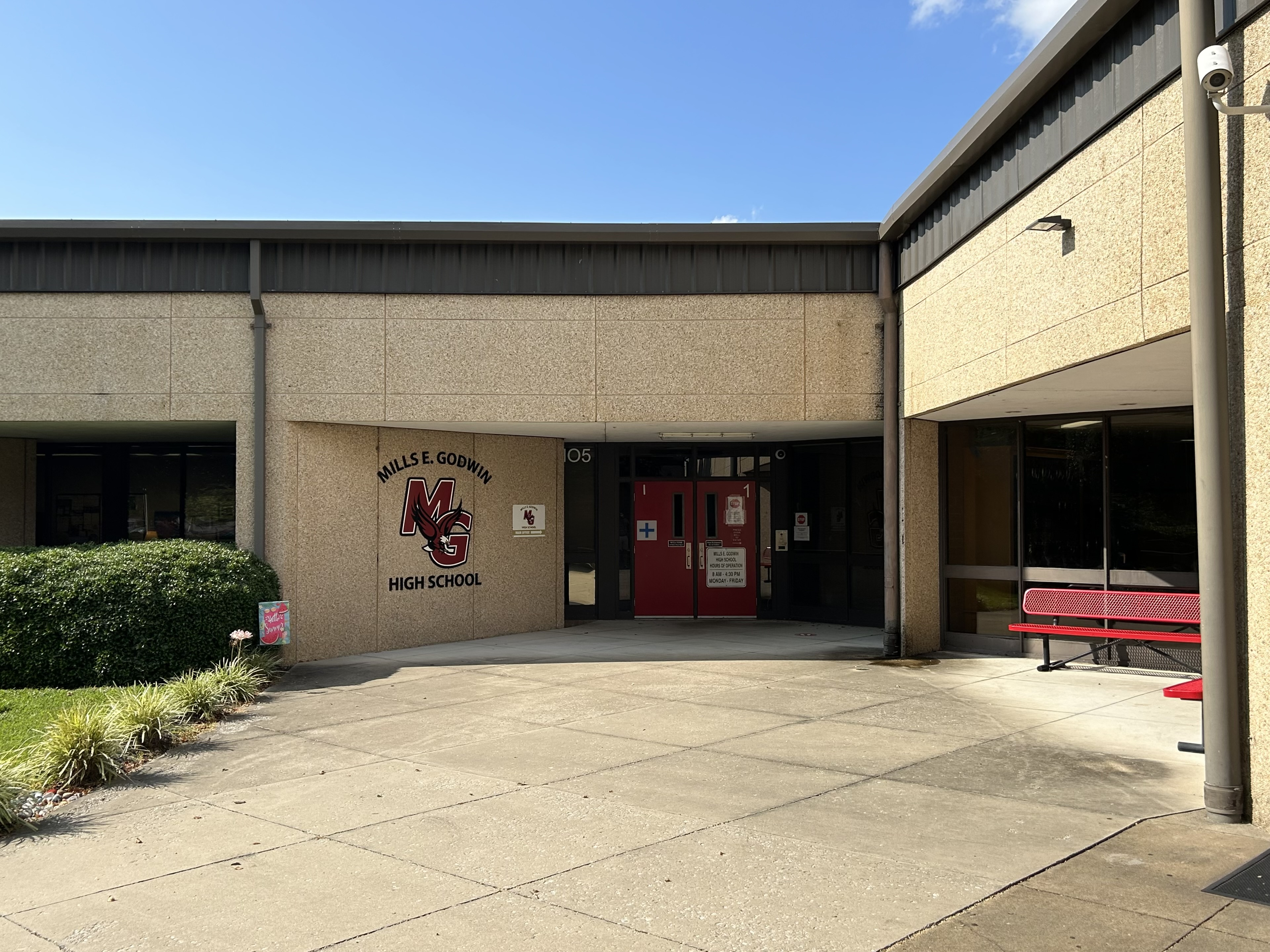

Location
- 2101 Pump Road; Henrico, Virginia 23238

Information
- School type: Public high school
- Motto: "Eagle Pride"
- Founded: 1980
- School district: Henrico County Public Schools
- Superintendent: Amy E. Cashwell
- Principal: Leigh Dunavant
- Staff: 95.42 (FTE)
- Grades: 9–12
- Enrollment: 1,702 (2025-26)
- Student to teacher ratio: 19.45
- Language: English
- Campus: Suburban
- Colors: Red, White, and Black
- Mascot: Eagle (represented by a bald eagle)
- Rivals: Douglas S. Freeman High School; Deep Run High School
- Newspaper: The Eagles Eyrie
- Yearbook: The Statesman
- Athletic Conference: Virginia High School League; AAA Central Region; AAA Colonial District
- Website: Official Site

Mills Edwin Godwin High School is a public high school located in the West End region of unincorporated Henrico County, Virginia. The school is operated by Henrico County Public Schools.

Godwin High School opened in 1981, named in honor of Mills E. Godwin Jr. (1914–1999), the two-term governor of Virginia. There are close to 2,000 students in the student body.

== Todd A. Phillips Center for Medical Sciences ==
The Science, Mathematics, and Technology Specialty Center, housed at Mills E. Godwin High School, opened in the fall of 1994. To be accepted into the center, students must pass a rigorous application process, during which approximately 50 students are selected from a pool usually exceeding 500, with an acceptance rate under 10%.

Students who have not completed Algebra I with a "B+" grade or higher are ineligible to apply. The Specialty Center provides students the opportunity to pursue scientific and mathematical courses, and offers exclusive classes and electives for them to take. Electives include Genetics & Biotechnology, Organic & Biochemistry, Microbiology and Immunology, Anatomy & Physiology, and Biostatistics.

There are six classrooms and two wet labs in the specialty center. Equipment includes a BSL 2 safety hood, an inverted microscope, a gas chromatograph, Genesis spectrophotometers, and a MyCycler PCR machine. On October 27, 2016, the Henrico County Public Schools School Board voted unanimously to rename the center in memorial of Todd A. Phillips, a former center teacher, and the first director of the newly designated Center for Medical Sciences, who was killed in a car accident in June 2016.

== Sporting achievements ==
- Swimming – In 2013, Godwin became the first Henrico County Public School to have a swim team. The team is considered a club and swims against local private schools and other Henrico County schools. Godwin Boys Swim Team won the VHSL State Meet in 2022 and 2023.
- Baseball – two AAA State Championships (1987 and 1999).
- Golf – 6 AAA State Championships, including 4 consecutive state championships (1994–1997, 2012, 2014).
- Tennis (boys) – 13 AAA state championships, the most in state history, most recently in 2009.
- Tennis (girls) – 10 AAA state championships, the most in state history, including finals appearance in each of the last 12 school years.
- Cross Country (boys) – 2011 team were Colonial District champions, regional champions, and finished fourth at the state meet.
- Football – Central Region Champions 1984, 1988; Colonial District Champions 1984, 1987, 1988, 1989,1990, 2000, 2003. Ranked as high as 19th nationally in 1989.
- Soccer (girls) – Became the first Girls soccer team in Godwin History to win the state title – 5A state champions in 2016. 2008, 2009, 2010 District Champions; 2009 Regional Champions 2009 State Finalists; 2015 Regional Champions and 2015 State Semi-finalists; 2016 5A State Champions.
- Soccer (boys) – Became the first Central Region team to win the AAA State Championship by finishing undefeated in 2003. The 2003 boys soccer team also finished the Spring season as the top team in the nation, recognized by Soccer America magazine, National Soccer Coaches Association of America, and Studentsports.com. In 2019, they won the VHSL Boys Soccer State Championships, vs. Deep Run, another high school in Henrico County.
- Track (boys) – won the school's first district championship in the indoor season of 09–10 as well as the outdoor season of 09–10.
- Cheerleading – 2000–2001 Team won Districts and Regionals, 2010 Won districts
- Lacrosse (girls) – 2019 District Champions
- Girls Volleyball – 1996 State Champions
- Wrestling – 1989 Regional Champions District Champions, 2009 District Champions
- Debate – 2014 Regional Champions, 2014 State Champions. 2015 Regional Champions.
- Robotics – TALON 540 Godwin Robotics is the 2013 Regional Engineering Inspiration Award winner, 2014 Regional Engineering Inspiration Award winner, 2016 District Engineering Inspiration Award winner, and the 2016 World Entrepreneurship Award winner (as well as a runner up for the World Innovation in Control Award). Since 2013, the team has been granted $15,000 from NASA in recognition of their outstanding outreach activities. In recent years, Talon 540 went to compete at a world level in 2013, 2014, 2015, and 2016, with only ~7% of teams qualifying for this event worldwide.
- Model United Nations – Jean-Bernard Gazarian Award for Diplomacy for representing the Best Small Delegation at the 38th Annual Old Dominion University Model United Nations Conference
- In 2012, the Godwin Winterguard won first place in their class at the AIA (Atlantic Indoor Association) Championships in Raleigh, North Carolina.

== Notable alumni ==
- Elaine Carroll (Class of 2001), actress
- Adam Cristman (Class of 2003), professional soccer player
- Adam Goldman (Class of 1991), two time Pulitzer Prize winning journalist for The New York Times
- Eric Fornataro, professional baseball pitcher
- Reed Garrett, professional baseball pitcher.
- Bailey Jay, porn actress and podcaster.
- Britton Wilson (Class of 2019), sprinter
