= List of middle schools in Central Virginia =

Schools for Grades 6-8 in central Virginia, USA

This is a list of middle schools in Central Virginia. Any school that is included in this list must meet the following criteria:

- In Goochland, Hanover, Chesterfield, Henrico, the City of Richmond, Amelia, or any other parts of the Richmond metro area.
- labeled middle school, intermediate school, or junior high school in title, or educate students in those grades.

Middle schools in Central Virginia follow state and their respective counties' laws. In this area the public middle schools normally have people that are from 6th to 8th grade. The middle schools are less common in counties than elementary schools because they have bigger facilities and combine more people than an elementary school. Private middle schools are sometimes religious (like Catholic schools) and are rarely a so-called "boarding school".

== Henrico County ==
=== Public ===
School	District	Grades	Website	Notes
Brookland Middle School	Brookland District	6–8		
Elko Middle School	Varina district	6–8		
Fairfield Middle School	Fairfield District	6–8		Received the Recognized ASCA Model Program (RAMP) designation from the American School Counselor Association.
Holman Middle School	Three Chopt District	6–8		
Hungary Creek Middle School	Brookland District	6–8		Where the Henrico County Spelling Bee is held.
George H. Moody Middle School	Brookland District	6–8		
Pocahontas Middle School	Three Chopt District	6–8		
Quioccasin Middle School	Tuckahoe District	6–8		Was selected as Virginia Educational Media (VEMA) library of the 2010 school year. School was renamed in 2016; formerly named for Harry F. Byrd, a pro-segregation politician.
John Rolfe Middle School	Varina District	6–8		
Short Pump Middle School	Three Chopt District	6–8		
Tuckahoe Middle School	Tuckahoe District	6–8		
L. Douglas Wilder Middle Schools	Fairfield District	6–8		

=== Private ===
- Mt. Vernon Middle School

== City of Richmond ==
=== Public ===
Name	Grades	Year opened	District	Website	Notes
Thomas C. Boushall Middle School	6–8	1986	8		Received the "Vanguard" middle school status from the State Department of Education in recognition of innovative program design and instruction in 1989.
Lucille Murray Brown Middle School	6–8	1999	4		
Dogwood Middle School	6–8	1915	5		Received the "Vanguard" middle school status from the State Department of Education in recognition of innovative program design and instruction in 1989. School was renamed in 2023; formerly named for James H. Binford, school superintendent in the 1870s.
Thomas H. Henderson Middle School	6–8	1973	3		Received the "Vanguard" middle school status from the State Department of Education in recognition of innovative program design and instruction in 1989.
Albert Hill Middle School	6–8	1933	1		
Martin Luther King Jr. Middle School	6–8	January 6, 2014	6		
River City Middle School	6–8	2020	9		River City MS replaced the former Elkhardt MS and Thompson MS.

== Chesterfield County ==
=== Public ===
School	Grades	Year opened	Website	Notes
Bailey Bridge Middle School	6–8	1991		
George W. Carver Middle School	6–8	unknown		
Elizabeth B. Davis Middle School	6–8	unknown		
Falling Creek Middle School	6–8	1966		
Manchester Middle School	6–8	1992		School moved to new location in 2020.
Matoaca Middle School	6–8	1975		Has two buildings (East and West) on one campus.
Midlothian Middle School	6–8	1984		
Providence Middle School	6–8	1968		
Robious Middle School	6–8	unknown		
Salem Church Middle School	6–8	1971		
Swift Creek Middle School	6–8	1979		
Tomahawk Creek Middle School	6–8	2008		

== Goochland County ==
=== Public ===
Name	Grades	Website	Notes
Goochland Middle School	6–8		Only middle school in Goochland County

== Hanover County ==
=== Public ===
Name	Grades	Website	Notes
Bell Creek Middle School	6–8		
Chickahominy Middle School	6–8		
Liberty Middle School	6–8		
Oak Knoll Middle School	6–8		

== City of Petersburg ==
=== Public ===
Name	Grades	Website	Notes
Vernon Johns Middle School	6–8		In 2017, VJMS became the only middle school in Petersburg when the 1952 Peabody Middle School was closed.

== Colonial Heights ==
=== Public ===
Name	Grades	Website	Notes
Colonial Heights Middle School	6–8		Only middle school in Colonial Heights

== Amelia County ==
=== Public ===
Name	Grades	Website	Notes
Amelia Middle School	6–8		Only middle school in Amelia County

== Caroline County ==
=== Public ===
Name	Grades	Website	Notes
Caroline Middle School	6–8		Only middle school in Caroline County

== Charles City County ==
Name	Grades	Website	Notes
Charles City County High School	6–12		Charles City County High School includes middle school students.

== Cumberland County ==
Name	Grades	Website	Notes
Cumberland Middle School	6–8		Only middle school in Cumberland County

== Dinwiddie County ==
Name	Grade	Website	Notes
Dinwiddie Middle School	6–8		Only middle school in Dinwiddie County

== King William County ==
Name	Grade	Website	Notes
Hamilton-Holmes Middle School	6–8		Only middle school in King William County
