= Douglas S. Freeman High School =

High school in Henrico, Virginia

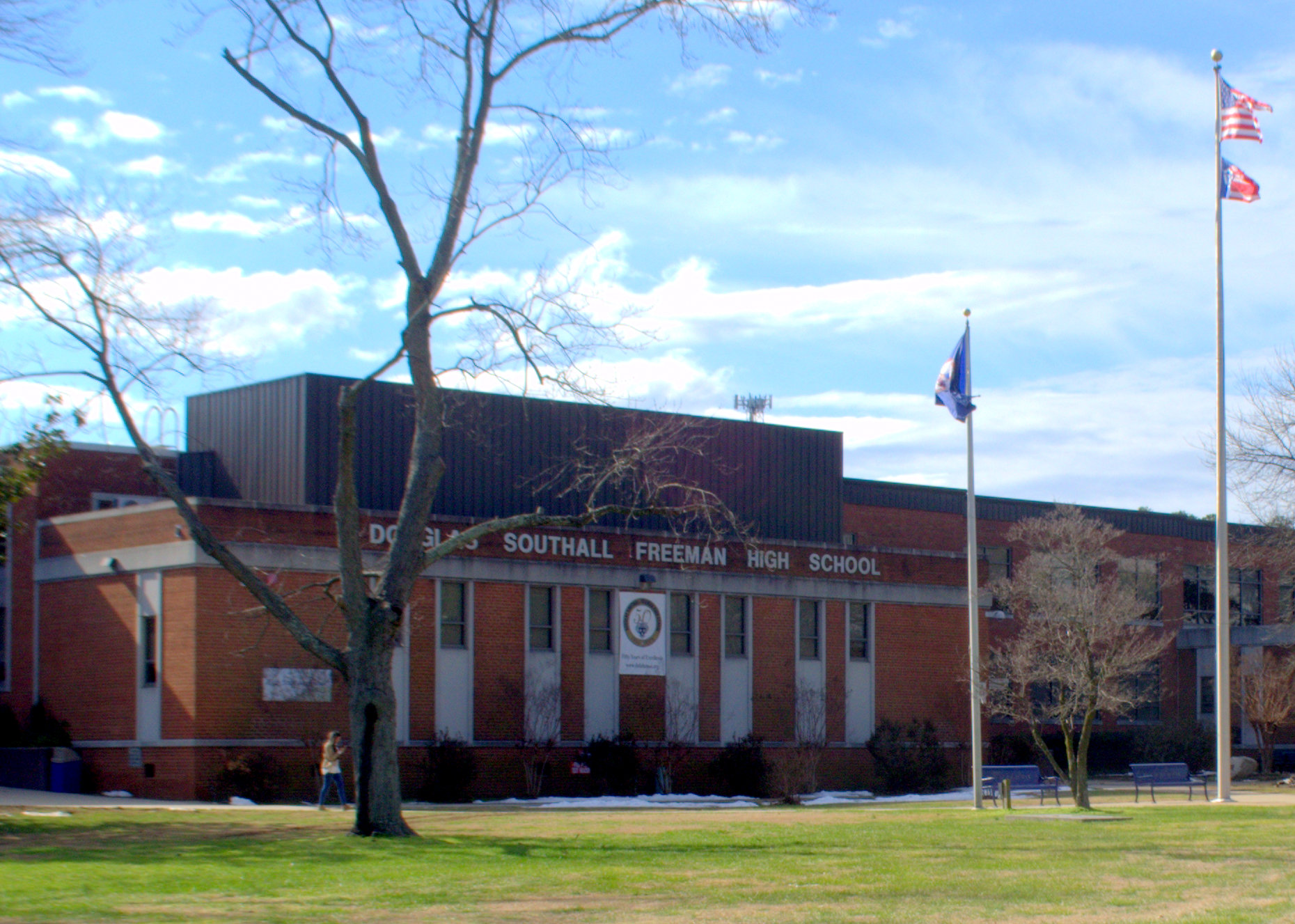
- Douglas S. Freeman High School in Henrico County, Virginia

Location
- 8701 Three Chopt Road; Henrico, Virginia 23229; 37°36′5.7″N 77°33′29.7″W

Information
- School type: Public high school
- Founded: 1954
- School district: Henrico County Public Schools
- Principal: John Marshall
- Staff: 100.82 (FTE)
- Grades: 9-12
- Enrollment: 1,846 (2021-22)
- Student to teacher ratio: 18.31
- Language: English
- Campus: Suburban
- Colors: Blue and gray
- Nickname: Mavericks; formerly "Rebels"
- Newspaper: The Commentator
- Yearbook: The Historian
- Literary magazine: The Educator
- Rival Schools: Mills E. Godwin High School; Deep Run High School
- Athletic conference: Virginia High School League; 5A South Region; Conference 11
- Website: Official Site

Douglas S. Freeman High School is a public high school located in the West End of Henrico County, Virginia. It is operated by Henrico County Public Schools.

== History ==
Part of Henrico County Public Schools, the high school is named after Pulitzer Prize-winning Virginia author, historian and pioneering radio broadcaster, Douglas Southall Freeman. It opened in 1954, slightly more than one year after Freeman's death.

James E. Ryan's book Five Miles Away, A World Apart: One City, Two Schools, and the Story of Educational Opportunity in Modern America explores the issue of economic school segregation by comparing Freeman to nearby Thomas Jefferson High School, located in the city of Richmond.

== Academics ==
Henrico County runs a system in which each high school contains a specialty center, a separate but integrated entity within the school that functions as a magnet program. The centers offer advanced courses to students who have clear interests and specific educational and/or career goals. Douglas Freeman High School's center is the Center for Leadership, Government and Global Economics. The Students learn the complexities of political, social and economic life. The also learn to analyze through modern lens and ambiguates of modern life.

== Athletics ==
Freeman is a member of the Virginia High School League. It competes in the 5A Central Region and 5A Colonial District. The school colors are blue and gray and the teams are nicknamed the "Mavericks". The colors and mascot were devised as a tribute to Douglas Freeman's extensive study of the Civil War. The school's nickname was the "Rebels" until being changed in 2020.

=== Virginia High School League AAA State Championship teams ===
- Boys' cross country: 1969, 2014
- Girls' cross country: 1999
- Football: 1967 (shared title with Annandale and Princess Anne)
- Golf: 1963
- Softball: 1980
- Boys' tennis: 1982, 1985, 1989, 2001
- Girls' tennis: 1983, 2021, 2022, 2023, 2024
- Boys' outdoor track: 1970
- Girls' volleyball: 2005
- Boys’ baseball: 2022
- Girls' Lacrosse: 2021, 2022, 2023, 2024
- Boys' Swimming & Diving: 2019, 2020, 2024
- Scholastic Bowl: 2022

The boys' volleyball team were VHSL AAA State semi-finalists in 2011 and 2012. The girls' soccer team was in the state tournament in 2013. The baseball team won the last Central Region championship in 2013, and as a result advanced to the state tournament. The girls' tennis and lacrosse team have won state championships every year since 2021.

== Media ==
The school publishes a newspaper (The Commentator), a literary magazine (The Educator), and a yearbook (The Historian).

Douglas Freeman High School was mentioned in a Washington Post article referring to the school's revival of the historic "Rebel Man" mascot.

== Notable alumni ==
- John Aboud – founder of Modern Humorist, and commentator on VH1's Best Week Ever
- Kevin Aviance – dance music artist and performer
- Dean Fleischer Camp – filmmaker and co-creator of Marcel the Shell with Shoes On and director of Lilo & Stitch
- Peter Hamby – head of News at Snapchat; Vanity Fair columnist; former CNN political correspondent
- Rich Landrum – Well known radio and TV announcer for WXEX (now WRIC) TV, as well the weekly syndicated (World Wide Wrestling TV show) www.midatlanticgateway.com
- Sheri Holman – bestselling novelist, screenwriter, and founding member of The Moth
- Bill Leverty – guitarist for the American rock band Firehouse
- Bernard Siegel – founder and Executive Director of the Genetics Policy Institute
- Tommy Siegel – guitarist and vocalist in pop band Jukebox the Ghost
- Barty Smith – player for NFL's Green Bay Packers (1974–1981); member of the Virginia Sports Hall of Fame Class of 1999
- Ellen Spiro – award-winning documentary filmmaker; class of 1982
- Constance Wu – actress, Fresh Off the Boat and Crazy Rich Asians.
- Elliott Yamin – third-place finisher on the fifth season of the TV show American Idol; was a student at Freeman High but never graduated
