= Waddey Harvey =

American football player (1947–1997)

No. 65
- Position: Defensive tackle

Personal information
- Born: March 26, 1947; Richmond, Virginia, U.S.
- Died: July 4, 1997 (aged 50)
- Listed height: 6 ft 4 in (1.93 m)
- Listed weight: 282 lb (128 kg)

Career information
- High school: Highland Springs (VA)
- College: Virginia Tech
- NFL draft: 1969: 8th round, 183rd overall pick

Career history
- Buffalo Bills (1969–1970)
- Stats at Pro Football Reference

James Wallace "Waddey" Harvey (March 26, 1947 – July 4, 1997) was an American professional football player who was a defensive tackle in the National Football League (NFL). He played for the Buffalo Bills from 1969 to 1970. He played college football for the Virginia Tech Hokies and was inducted into the Virginia Tech Sports Hall of Fame.
