= Ron Burton (linebacker) =

American football player and coach (born 1964)

No. 22
- Position: Linebacker

Personal information
- Born: May 2, 1964 (age 62); Highland Springs, Virginia, U.S.
- Listed height: 6 ft 1 in (1.85 m)
- Listed weight: 250 lb (113 kg)

Career information
- High school: Highland Springs
- College: North Carolina
- NFL draft: 1987: undrafted

Career history

Playing
- Dallas Cowboys (1987–1989); Phoenix Cardinals (1989); Los Angeles Raiders (1990)

Coaching
- North Carolina (1992–1993) Graduate assistant; Morehead State (1994) Defensive backs coach; Eastern Michigan (1995–1996) Linebackers coach; Indiana (1997–2001) Linebackers coach; Grand Valley State (2002) Defensive line coach; Air Force (2003–2012) Defensive line coach; Michigan State (2013–2016) Defensive line coach; Michigan State (2017–2019) Defensive tackles coach; Michigan State (2020–2021) Defensive line coach; Miami (OH) (2022) Defensive line coach; Tulsa (2023–2024) Assistant head coach & defensive line coach; Birmingham Stallions (2025) Defensive line coach

Career NFL statistics
- Sacks: 2
- Fumble recoveries: 2
- Interceptions: 1
- Stats at Pro Football Reference

Ronald Leon Burton (born May 2, 1964) is an American former professional football player who was a linebacker in the National Football League (NFL) for the Dallas Cowboys, Phoenix Cardinals, and Los Angeles Raiders. He most recently was the defensive tackles coach for Michigan State University. He played college football for the North Carolina Tar Heels.

== Early life ==
Burton attended Highland Springs High School, where he was an all-state, all-district and all-region selection as an outside linebacker. He was named the prep player of the year in 1982. He also practiced basketball.

== College career ==
Burton accepted a football scholarship from the University of North Carolina at Chapel Hill. He was a four-year letterman at defensive end (1982–86) and made three bowl appearances. He became a starter as a junior.

He was named the team's captain and best defensive lineman as a senior in 1986. His eight sacks during the season at the time tied him for seventh on the school's single-season record list.

He finished his college career with 161 tackles and 15 sacks. He graduated in 1987 with a degree in Industrial relations.

== Professional career ==
Burton was signed by the Dallas Cowboys as an undrafted free agent after the 1987 NFL draft, he dropped in the draft because he was seen as undersized to play on the defensive line. He was converted into a linebacker during training camp. As a rookie, he led the team with 19 special teams tackles. He started two of the last three games at middle linebacker because of injuries to Eugene Lockhart, finishing with 29 tackles. In the season finale against the St. Louis Cardinals Cardinals, he posted 17 tackles, three passes defensed and one forced fumble.

In 1988, he was named the starter at left outside linebacker over an injured Mike Hegman. He recorded 74 tackles (seventh on the team), two sacks, five passes defensed, one forced fumble and 11 special teams tackles. In 1989, he started three games, tallying 14 tackles, one interception, one pass defensed and two special teams tackles before being released on October 16.

On October 21, 1989, he was signed as a free agent by the Phoenix Cardinals. He appeared in 10 games as a backup linebacker.

On April 2, 1990, he was signed as a free agent by the Los Angeles Raiders. He played in five games before being lost for the year with a knee injury he suffered against the Buffalo Bills. The team would go on to reach the 1990 AFC Championship Game. On July 13, 1991, he was released because of a knee injury.

== Coaching career ==
=== Early years (1992–2001) ===
After spending two seasons as a graduate assistant for the University of North Carolina, Burton took his first full-time assistant coaching position at Morehead State University in 1994. He worked with the defensive backs for one season and then went to Eastern Michigan University, where he served two seasons as the linebackers coach.

He was the linebackers coach at the Indiana University for five seasons (1997–2001) where he was responsible for the development of two Butkus Award nominees, Justin Smith and Jabar Robinson.

Burton was the defensive line coach at Grand Valley State University and helped the school to the NCAA Division II national championship in 2002, the first in school history. GVSU was a perfect 14–0 in Burton's first season at the school.

=== Air Force ===
Burton spent 10 seasons as the Defensive Line Coach for the Air Force Academy (2003–2012). He contributed to the school's 67–57 (.540) winning record and a school record six consecutive bowl appearances (2007–2012).

The 2011's inexperienced group at the beginning of the season became a strength with multiple freshmen playing significant snaps. In 2010, he led Rick Ricketts to an all-conference year and defensive most valuable player honors in the Independence Bowl. In 2009, Burton led senior Ben Garland to all-conference honors and a free agent signing with the Denver Broncos in the NFL. In 2007, defensive end Jake Paulson was a first-team all-conference choice.

=== Michigan State ===
On February 8, 2013, Burton was hired as the Defensive Line Coach for Michigan State University. He was named the defensive tackles assistant coach in 2017. He received the FootballScoop National Defensive Line Coach of the Year Award twice (2013 and 2018). He contributed to the school winning the Big Ten Championship and the Rose Bowl in 2013. On February 14, 2020, it was reported that Burton was leaving Michigan State to join Indiana as the new defensive line coach after Mark Dantonio retired as Michigan State head coach. Later, on February 15, 2020, it was announced that Burton would remain at Michigan State as defensive line coach on new head coach Mel Tucker's staff.

== Personal life ==
A native of Highland Springs, Virginia, Burton and his wife, Andrea, have four children, Ronald, Ryan, Roya and Reid. He also has two younger brothers Tony and Daryl.
