= Sonya T. Smith =

American mechanical engineer

- Occupations: Mechanical engineer; professor

Academic background
- Education: Valdosta State University (B.S.); University of Virginia (M.S., Ph.D.)

Academic work
- Institutions: Howard University

Sonya Teresa Smith is an American mechanical engineer whose research involves computational fluid dynamics and thermal management of electronics for air and space vehicles. She is a professor at Howard University, the director of the atmospheric sciences program at Howard University, and the 2020–2021 president of Sigma Xi.

== Education and career ==
Smith is the daughter of mathematician Emma B. Smith and historian James W. Smith, both professors at Virginia State University; she is a graduate of Matoaca High School in Virginia. She majored in mathematics at Valdosta State University, with an emphasis in computer science, and graduated with a B.S. in 1986. After working as a programmer and engineer at NASA's Langley Research Center from 1986 to 1989, she returned to graduate study in mechanical and aerospace engineering at the University of Virginia, where she earned a master's degree in 1991 and completed her Ph.D. in 1995, as the first African-American woman in that program. Her dissertation, The Nonlinear Interaction of Goertler Vortices and Tollmien-Schlichting Waves in Compressible Boundary Layers, was supervised by Hossein Haj-Hariri.

She joined Howard University as an assistant professor in 1995 and was promoted to associate professor in 2001 and full professor in 2010. She served as chair of mechanical engineering from 2011 to 2015. She was the first woman in mechanical engineering to earn tenure at Howard University, the first to become a full professor, and the first to become department chair. In addition to conducting research at the National Institute on Deafness and Other Communication disorders in Bethesda & Maryland as a visiting researcher, she oversaw the Computer Learning and Design center at Howard University in 2003. She was a major investigator in the HU ADVANCE-IT initiative, which encourages the recruitment of women in STEM. This award from the NSF would allow Howard to go on and create a permanent model that focuses on and increases female leaders in STEM. Smith then became co-principal investigator for the National Science Foundation's Engineering Research Center for Power Optimization of Electro-Thermal Systems. She used this position to establish Howard University's first Applied Fluids and Therma; Engineering Research Laboratory.

== Recognition ==
Given by the US Black Engineer and Information Technology magazine, Sonya was awarded the Science Spectrum Trailblazer award in 2005. Smith was elected as president of Sigma Xi, an honor society for American scientists and engineers, for the 2020–2021 term. In 2021, Smith was named to the American Academy of Arts and Sciences. She is also a Fellow of the American Society of Mechanical Engineers.
