= Deep Run High School =

Public high school in Virginia, US

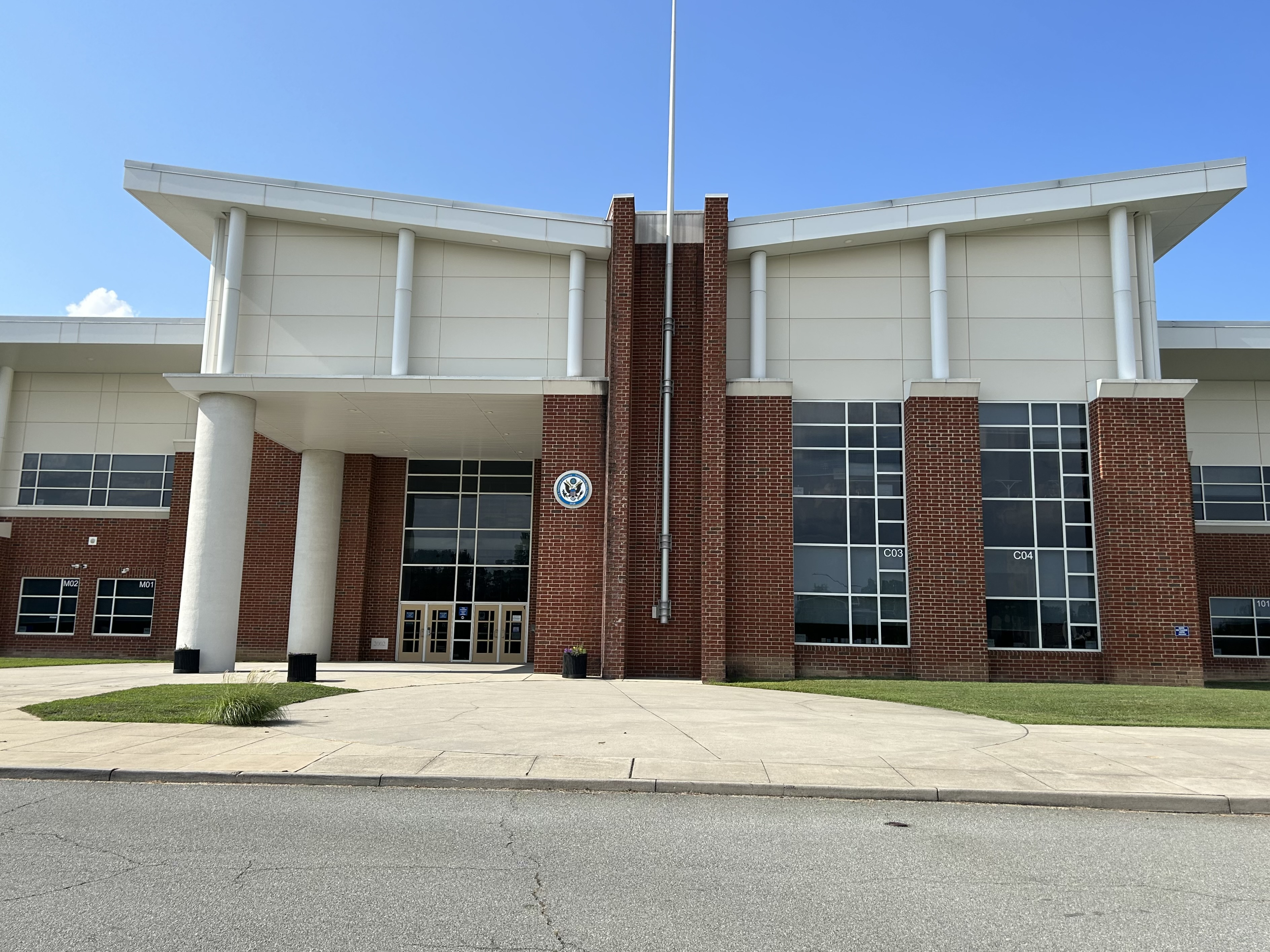

Location
- 4801 Twin Hickory Road; Glen Allen, Virginia 23059; United States; 37°40′29″N 77°35′55″W

Information
- School type: Public, high school
- Founded: 2002
- School district: Henrico County Public Schools
- Superintendent: Amy Cashwell
- Principal: Brian Fellows
- Staff: 102.00 (on an FTE basis)
- Grades: 9–12
- Enrollment: 2,027 (2022–23)
- Student to teacher ratio: 19.87
- Campus: Suburban
- Colors: Black and royal blue
- Athletics conference: Virginia High School League; AAA Central Region; AAA Colonial District
- Mascot: Wildcat
- Newspaper: The Sentinel
- Yearbook: The Pride
- Website: deeprun.henricoschools.us

Deep Run High School is a part magnet high school in Henrico County, Virginia, United States. It is named after Deep Run School, one of Henrico County's first schools which was a two-room schoolhouse that can still be found on the grounds of Short Pump Elementary School. The school had approximately 1,900 students and over 135 faculty members during the 2022-2023 school year. About 200 students are part of the Center for Information Technology, a highly competitive magnet program open to all county residents. Deep Run is consistently highly ranked.

In the 2023 rankings, U.S. News & World Report, which ranked 17,680 schools, ranked Deep Run High School #1 in Henrico County, #3 in the Richmond metro area, #11 in Virginia, #90 in national magnet high schools, and #567 nationally. Despite having a robust and very competitive Center for Information Technology enrolling 50-60 students per grade, Deep Run HS was not mentioned on the US News best STEM high school list, perhaps due to not being classified as a “STEM school.”

== History ==
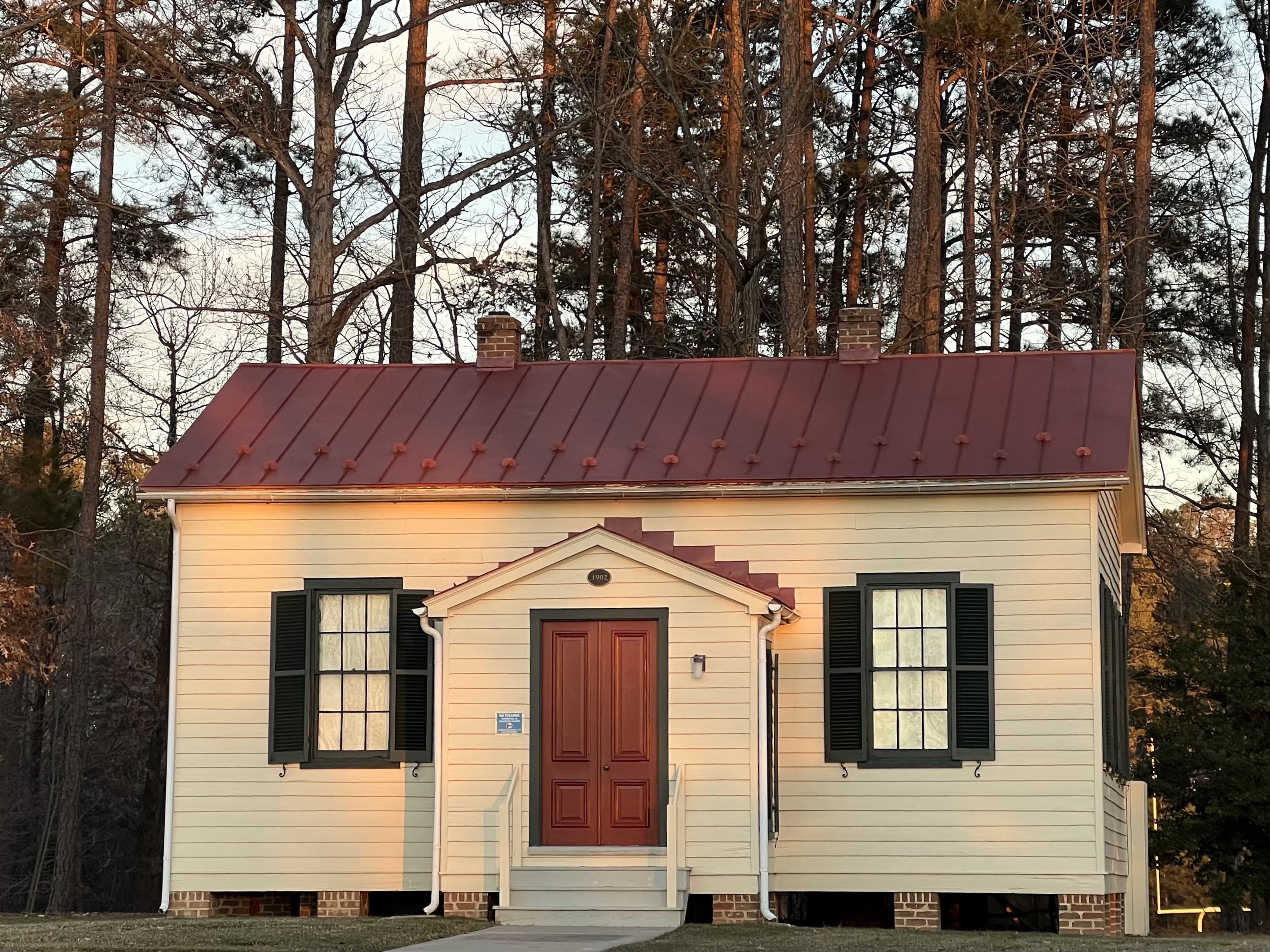
Deep Run School building

Deep Run High School was named after one of Henrico County's first schools: Deep Run School. Deep Run School was a two-room schoolhouse that can still be found on the grounds of Short Pump Elementary School.

In 2002, Deep Run opened its doors solely to freshmen and sophomores as the newest member of Henrico County's public schools. While freshmen entered from neighboring middle schools (Short Pump Middle School and Pocahontas Middle School), incoming sophomores predominantly transferred from John Randolph Tucker High School. Deep Run reached full capacity during its 2004–2005 academic year and graduated its first class on June 16, 2005.

In 2007, Deep Run became overcrowded due to increased buildup of surrounding areas. To alleviate the problem, during the summer of 2008, six trailers were placed on school property for the 2008–2009 school year. They were removed during the summer of 2010, when Glen Allen High School was opened.

== Sports history ==
The Deep Run Men's Volleyball team won the class 5A State Title in 2017, 2018, 2019, and 2020

The competition cheerleading team won the state championship in December 2019.

== During the COVID-19 pandemic ==
During the COVID-19 pandemic, the last day for in-person classes was March 13, 2020. Students completed some work online to finish out the school year. Classes stayed virtual for the school opening in September 2020. The school day was shortened by one hour after parents expressed concern over the number of hours students were spending on their laptops. On March 1 and 2, 2021, the school reopened for a small number of 9th graders who had opted back in to in-person instruction (via a form completed in November 2020.) The following Monday, March 8, 2021, upperclassmen who had opted in joined the 9th graders in-person for a modified schedule. Many seniors opted to stay virtual. Teachers taught the in-person and the virtual students at the same time. The school day remained shortened. Wednesdays remained virtual and were called "Wellness Wednesdays." Students were assigned 25 minutes of work per class on Wednesdays and were required to participate in a half hour "wellness" lesson. The Wildcat Weekly Newsletter dated March 10–16, 2021 indicated that "over 350" students had returned to the building out of "1,882." (Just under 20%.) Masks were required to be worn, and students were assigned seats far apart from one another during lunchtime.

On Wednesday, September 8, 2021, all Henrico County Schools, including Deep Run High School, fully reopened. Some restrictions, like mandatory masking, were still in place due to the Delta variant. The mask mandate was eventually lifted by the county on February 2, 2022.

== Center for Information Technology ==
Deep Run High School is home to Henrico County Public Schools' Center for Information Technology (CIT). Students are challenged with a rigorous curriculum with advanced math and computer science classes, as well as special clubs, internships, optional senior capstone projects, and other opportunities. The CIT has nine teachers focusing on teaching only CIT classes.

The CIT is open to all Henrico County students, who must apply for admission, as spots are limited. Students are evaluated based on various factors, including recommendations, math ability, writing prompts, and demonstrated interest in computer science.

== Notable alumni ==
- Antone Exum, musician and former NFL safety
- Deck McGuire, MLB pitcher
- R. C. Orlan, MLB pitcher
- Brian Ownby, soccer player
- Todd Wharton, soccer player
