= Thomas Dale High School =

Public high school in Virginia, US

Coordinates: 37°21′44.8″N 77°26′12.8″W

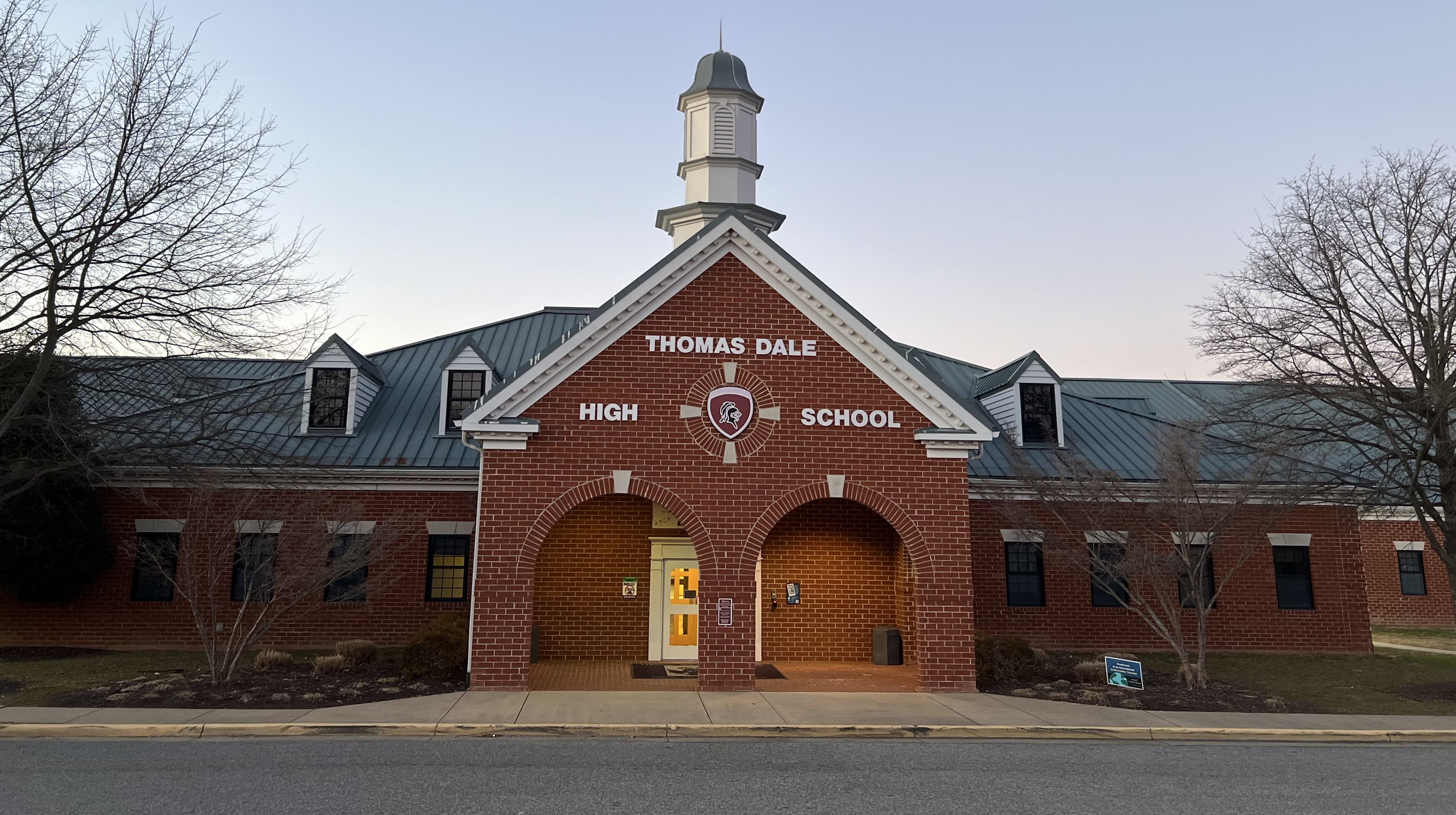

Location
- 3626 West Hundred Road; Chester, Virginia 23831; United States

Information
- School type: Public, high school
- Founded: 1906
- Locale: Suburban, Large
- School district: Chesterfield County Public Schools
- NCES District ID: 5100840
- Superintendent: John Murray
- NCES School ID: 510084000350
- Principal: Anthony McLaurin
- Teaching staff: 190.46 (on an FTE basis)
- Grades: 9–12
- Enrollment: 2,582 (2024–25)
  - Grade 9: 689
  - Grade 10: 660
  - Grade 11: 594
  - Grade 12: 639
- Student to teacher ratio: 13.56
- Language: English
- Colors: Maroon and gray
- Athletics conference: Virginia High School League; Central Region; Central District
- Mascot: Knight
- Feeder schools: Elizabeth Davis Middle School; George W. Carver Middle School
- Specialty center: Fine and Performing Arts
- Website: Official Site

Thomas Dale High School is a public high school located in Chester, an unincorporated community in Chesterfield County, Virginia, United States.

It was named for Sir Thomas Dale, a 17th-century leader in the Virginia Colony. The high school is operated by the local school division, Chesterfield County Public Schools.

== History ==
Thomas Dale High School was named for Sir Thomas Dale, an English naval commander who served as colonial deputy-governor of the Colony of Virginia.

=== Buildings and names ===
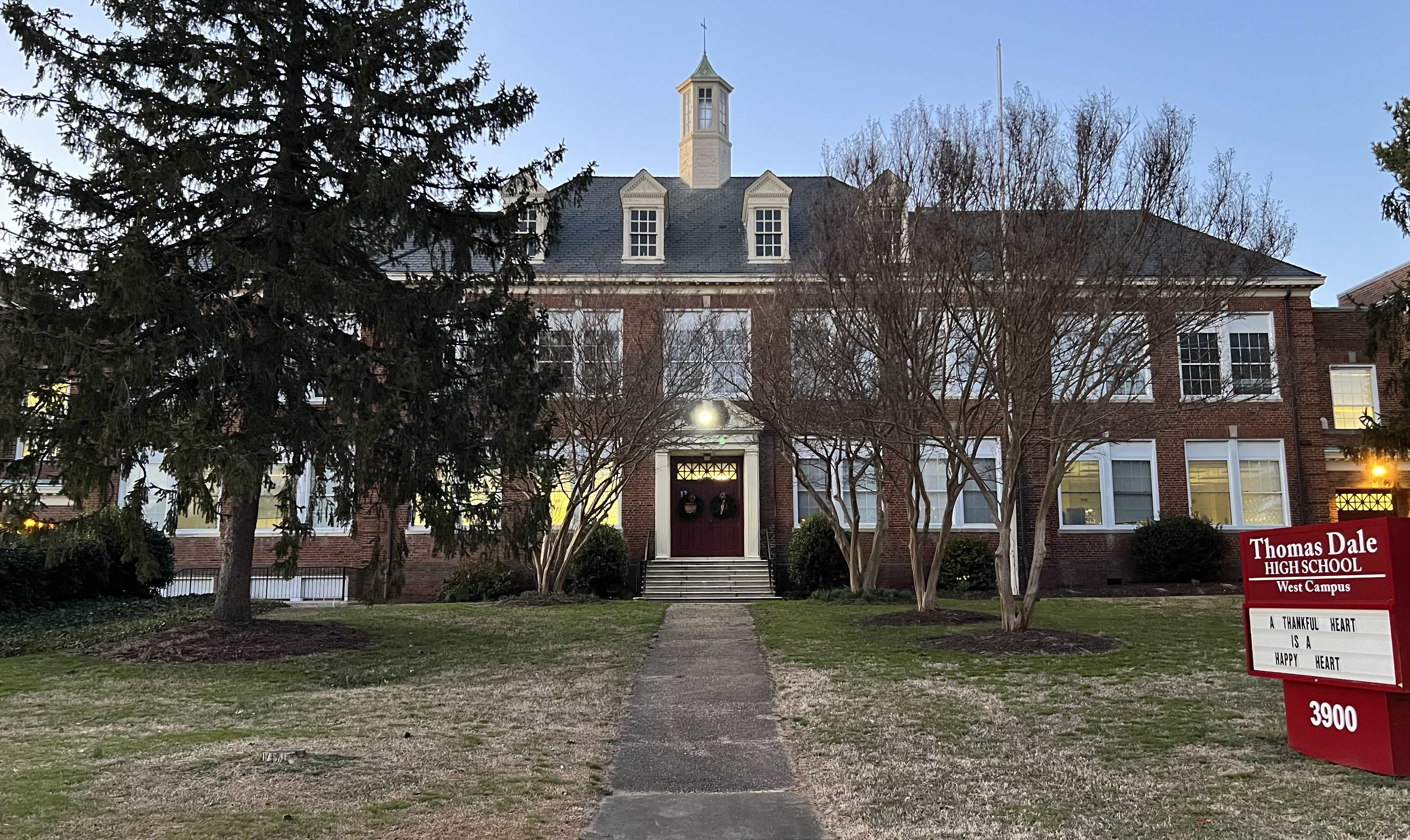
Thomas Dale High School's west campus, formerly Chester Middle School.

The school was built in 1906 and named Chester Agricultural High School. In 1917, it was renamed Chester High School. In 1942 it was given its current name of Thomas Dale High School.

In the early 1940s, a new building was constructed on the western side of the original building. This building, formerly known as Chester Middle School, stands today as the Thomas Dale Ninth Grade Campus. The 1906 structure was later demolished. In 1964, another replacement facility opened less than a mile east on State Route 10.

In the mid-1980s, the building saw a small expansion, followed in the early 1990s by some interior renovation and the addition of air conditioning.

To alleviate overcrowding, an annex known as the Thomas Dale West Campus opened in 1997 in the former Carver Middle School building on Branders Bridge Road. This facility housed the 9th grade.

Between 1999 and 2001, the 1964 building underwent a massive expansion and a complete interior and exterior renovation. Thomas Dale West Campus closed with the completion of this project. The Thomas Dale West Campus was later turned into what is now the Carver College and Career Center (formerly Community High School).

Though the 2001 expansion was projected to accommodate the school's population for decades, the student population grew rapidly. It was decided that neighboring Chester Middle School would be shut down due to budget cuts and the overcrowding at Thomas Dale, thus the high school annexed Chester Middle. Ninth graders are currently housed at the former Chester Middle School, now known as the Thomas Dale Ninth Grade Campus, while 10th - 12th graders are at the main campus.

== Academics ==
TDHS is ranked among the top 13,000-17,000 high schools in America, 263-320th in Virginia, 34-46 in the Richmond Metro Area, and 9-11 out of 11 high schools in CCPS. 22% of students participate in AP courses. The graduation rate is 91%.

== Sports ==
The athletic teams compete as the "Knights" and wear the school colors of maroon and gray.

- Baseball: Following a 2007 District Tournament Championship, the 2008 team went 20–3 on their way to a regular-season and tournament crown. The 2009 team again won the regular-season championship and advanced to the regional semi-finals before a close loss to Deep Run.
- Football: Thomas Dale won their first state football championship on December 12, 2009, defeating Lake Braddock.
- Soccer: In 2005, the Knights varsity boys soccer team won the Virginia State AAA soccer Championship. They successfully defended that title in 2006.
- Tennis: The Thomas Dale Boys tennis team claimed five titles in 2010: Coach of the year, Player of the Year and Boys Singles titles, Boys Doubles title, and Team District Champions. The 2011 season gave the Knights their 3rd straight district title, ending the year with a 14–0 record.
- Volleyball: The Thomas Dale 2007 boys volleyball went 26–0, losing only three sets all season, on their way to Thomas Dale's third team state title in three years (Boys soccer 2005, 2006).
- Wrestling: The wrestling team won the Central Region Championship in 1975, 1988, 1990, and 2008.

== Notable alumni ==
- Will Bates (2009), former MLS player
- Roger Bothe (2006), former professional soccer player
- Melissa Harris-Perry (1991), former MSNBC TV host, professor of politics and African-American Studies at Wake Forest University
- William Henderson (1990), retired NFL player
- Rudi Johnson (1998), retired NFL player
- Ken Oxendine (1994), retired NFL player
- C. J. Reavis, NFL player
- Joe Sloan (2005), college football quarterback, Offensive Coordinator for the LSU Tigers.
- Chris Tyree (2020), college football wide receiver for the Notre Dame Fighting Irish and the Virginia Cavaliers
- Lacey Waldrop (2011), pro softball player
- Nate Eaton (2015), pro baseball player
- Ron Loper Jr. (2025), American rapper and songwriter known professionally as twinnjrr!
