= Ross Monroe Winter =

American violinist and teacher (born 1981)

Ross Monroe Winter (born July 7, 1981) is an American violinist and teacher. He is currently associate professor of violin at the University of Central Florida. In 2020, he served as associate concertmaster at Florida’s Venice Symphony.

Prior to this, his musical background included being a member of the Virginia and Richmond Symphony Orchestras, IRIS Orchestra, and performed with the National Symphony, Baltimore Symphony, New Jersey Symphony, Alabama Symphony, among others. He also currently serves as Principal Second Violin with the Wintergreen Festival Orchestra in Virginia.

He has also held similar positions with the University of Northern Iowa School of Music, and at George Mason University, University of Mary Washington, and has taught at Virginia Commonwealth University, New England Conservatory Preparatory School, and given master classes throughout the country. His most notable student has been Robert Downey, Jr. for the film, Sherlock Holmes.
