= Colonial District =

The Colonial District is an athletic district of the Virginia High School League that includes public schools in the Greater Richmond Region.

== Facts about the district ==
The Colonial District schools are located north and northwest of the James River, which include Richmond's West End.

== Member schools ==
The Colonial District contains eight schools, which compete in Class 6, Class 5, Class 3 and Class 2 sports based on school's enrollment. As of 2026 the schools in the district are:

- Deep Run High School of Henrico County
- Douglas S. Freeman High School of Henrico County
- Mills E. Godwin High School of Henrico County
- Glen Allen High School of Henrico County
- Hermitage High School of Henrico County
- Thomas Jefferson High School of Richmond
- John Marshall High School of Richmond
- John Randolph Tucker High School of Henrico County.
