= Capital District (VHSL) =

The Capital District consist of public schools located East and Northeast of the James River in the Greater Richmond Region.

Capital District schools compete in Class 6, Class 4, and Class 3 based on school enrollment.

== Member schools ==
School	Location	Mascot	Colors	Class
Armstrong High School	Richmond	Wildcats		3
Atlee High School	Mechanicsville	Raiders		4
Hanover High School	Mechanicsville	Hawks		4
Henrico High School	Henrico	Warriors		4
Highland Springs High School	Highland Springs	Springers		6
Mechanicsville High School	Mechanicsville	Mustangs		4
Patrick Henry High School	Ashland	Patriots		4
Varina High School	Henrico	Blue Devils		4
