= Central District (VHSL) =

The Central District is a geographic division of public schools under Virginia High School League. It consists of schools from the Greater Richmond Region.
