= Glen Allen High School =

Public high school in Virginia, US

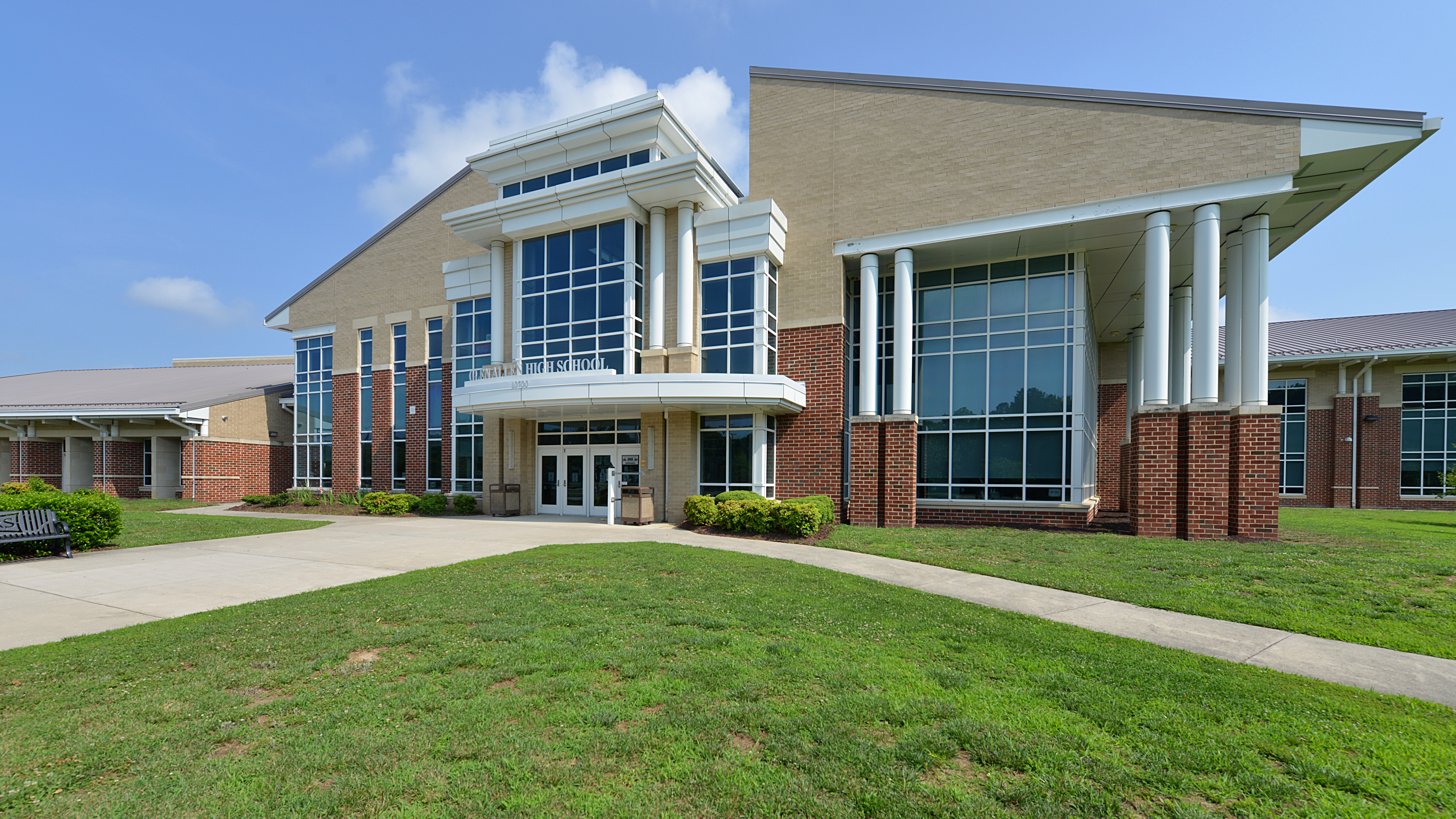

Location
- 10700 Staples Mill Road; Glen Allen, Virginia 23060; United States; 37.6660°N 77.5343°W

Information
- School type: Public High School
- Founded: 2010
- School district: Henrico County Public Schools
- Superintendent: Amy E. Cashwell
- Principal: Reginald Davenport
- Staff: 98.86
- Grades: 9-12
- Enrollment: 2,044 (2021-22)
- Student to teacher ratio: 20.68
- Campus: Suburban
- Colors: Teal, Black and White
- Nickname: Jaguars, Jags
- Newspaper: The Paw Print
- Yearbook: The Predator
- Website: glenallenhs.henricoschools.us
- Sources: SchoolDigger.com, Henrico County Public Schools

Glen Allen High School, established in 2010, is a public school located in Henrico County, Virginia. The mascot of GAHS is the Jaguar, and the school's current principal is Carene O'Neal. Glen Allen is the 16th best high school in Virginia, the 533rd best high school in America, and is one of nine high schools in Henrico County. 65 percent of the student body participates in AP classes. The student body is 51 percent female and 49 percent male. 38 percent of the school is made up of minorities. Glen Allen has a 19:1 student-faculty ratio. Virginia state senator Schuyler VanValkenburg is a social studies teacher at the school. Glen Allen is a Gold Level LEED Certified building, and is the only school in the county with this distinction.

== Curriculum ==
The curriculum includes Advanced Placement (AP) courses. Both standard and advanced diplomas are issued. Advanced diplomas are given to students who take advanced courses in several different subjects.

== Academic performance ==
Students planning to attend community colleges or universities made up 82% of the Class of 2014. That year, of the 1,055 AP examinations administered to students at this school, 62% received scores of three through five.

== Sports ==
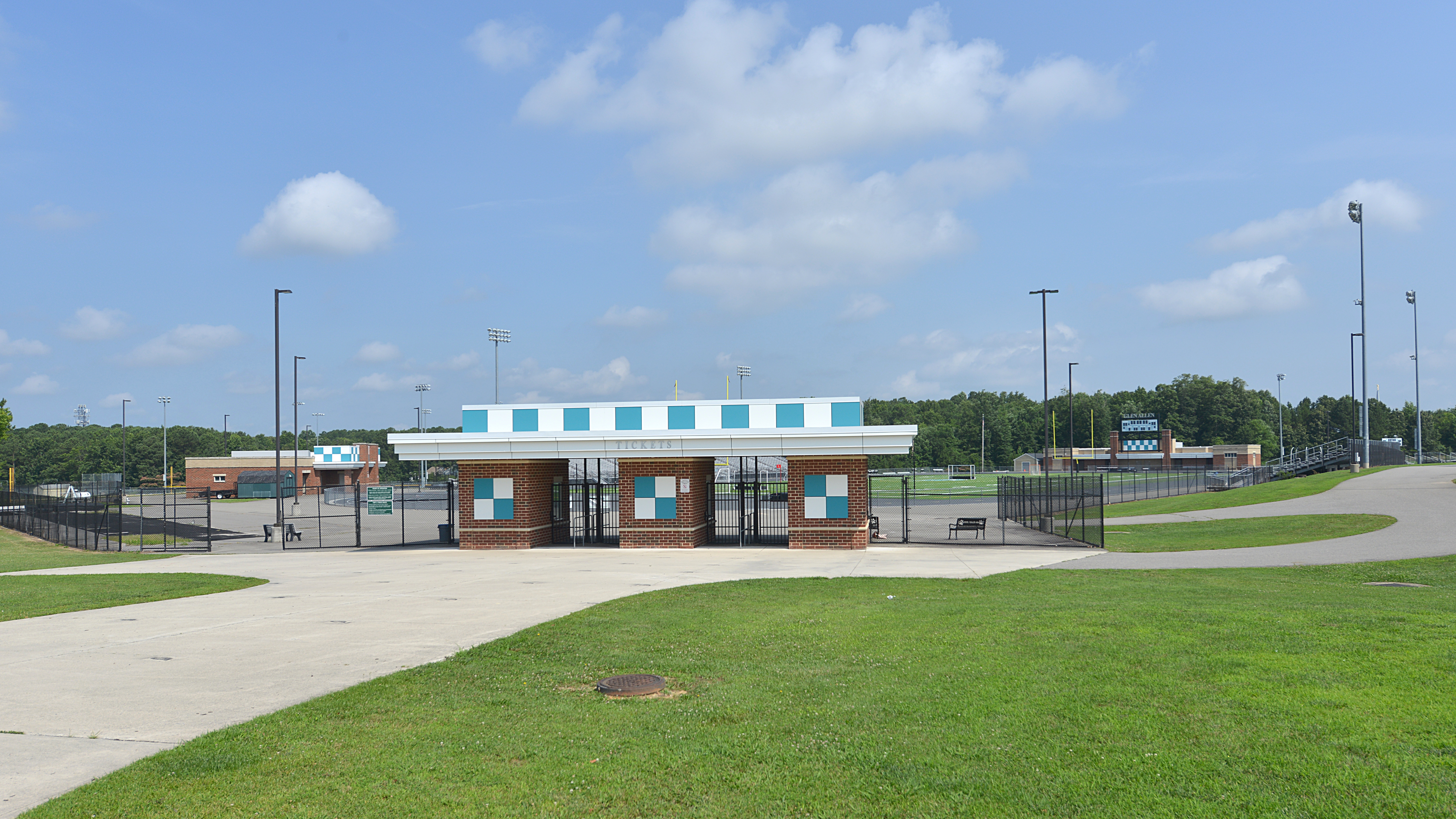
Glen Allen High School Stadium, Glen Allen, VA

Glen Allen's athletic teams are named the "Jaguars" and they compete in the Virginia High School League's Colonial District.

Sports are popular at the school, and a variety are offered. Football games are highly attended, among basketball games, wrestling matches and lacrosse games.

Sports Offered:

Field Hockey
Boys’ Volleyball
Girls’ Volleyball
Cross Country
Golf
Cheerleading
Competition Cheerleading
Dance Team
Football
Boys’ Basketball
Girls’ Basketball
Wrestling
Gymnastics
Indoor Track
Swimming
Boys’ Soccer
Girls’ Soccer
Baseball
Softball
Boys’ Tennis
Girls’ Tennis
Outdoor Track
Boys’ Lacrosse
Girls’ Lacrosse

== Bibliography ==
- https://www.usnews.com/education/best-high-schools/virginia/districts/henrico-county-pubilc-schools/glen-allen-high-school-92328
