= Virginia High School League =

U.S. high school sports association

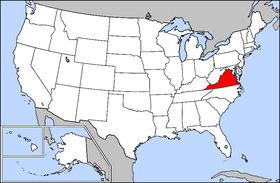
- Abbreviation: VHSL
- Formation: 1913
- Type: Volunteer; NPO
- Legal status: Association
- Purpose: Athletic/Educational
- Headquarters: 1642 State Farm Blvd. Charlottesville, Virginia 22911
- Region served: Virginia
- Members: 300+ public high schools
- Executive Director: John W. “Billy” Haun, Ed.D.
- Affiliations: National Federation of State High School Associations
- Staff: 15
- Website: vhsl.org
- Remarks: (434) 977-8475

The Virginia High School League (VHSL) is the principal sanctioning organization for interscholastic athletic competition among public high schools in the U.S. state of Virginia. The VHSL first sponsored debate and also continues to sponsor state championships in several academic activities.

Private and religious schools and teams of homeschooled students belong to other sanctioning organizations, the largest of which is the Virginia Independent Schools Athletic Association. Proposals in the Virginia General Assembly to mandate that the VHSL allow homeschooled students to compete for the public high school they would otherwise attend have failed to pass.

== History ==
The Virginia High School League (VHSL) was founded in 1913 at the University of Virginia, by members of the Jefferson Literary and Debating Society and the Washington Literary Society and Debating Union. It was initially created as a debating league for boys in Virginia high schools. Within a few years, it expanded to include literary competitions such as oral reading and extemporaneous speaking, and by the late 1910s, it added athletics — including baseball, basketball, and track — prompting its renaming to the Virginia High School Literary and Athletic League.

By 1920, over 250 high schools were affiliated with the league. Its rapid growth helped establish uniform rules, structured interscholastic competition, and regular state championships. Following World War II, the VHSL began expanding further into sports such as football, wrestling, and golf, while also implementing more standardized rules and officiating practices.

A major structural change occurred in 1969, when the VHSL merged with the Virginia Interscholastic Association (VIA), which had been founded in 1954 to oversee athletics and academic competitions for African American high schools during the era of segregation. The merger represented a key moment in the integration of Virginia's public high school system.

Girls’ sports were formally added to VHSL sanctioned competition in the early 1970s, following broader national shifts prompted by the enactment of Title IX in 1972.

In 1970, the VHSL launched the first statewide football playoffs, establishing a postseason structure that remains a hallmark of Virginia high school athletics.

== Organization ==
The VHSL is headquartered in Charlottesville, Virginia, and has 308 member schools and conducts championships in 27 different sports. Nearly 200,000 students participate in its activities annually. The VHSL is overseen by an Executive Committee elected from the principals and superintendents of the various Virginia school districts. Day-to-day affairs are handled by the Executive Director and Assistant Directors.

=== Former classifications, basis for regular season competition ===
From 1970 to 2013, the VHSL's member schools were organized into three group classifications based on enrollment: A, AA, and AAA. Each of the three groups were split into four geographic regions, which usually contained three or four districts. District sizes vary and consist of four to eleven teams. The group of schools with the largest enrollments were in Group AAA, the group with the next largest enrollments were in Group AA, and the schools with the smallest enrollments were in Group A. Regional boundaries were different for all three groups as average school sizes vary substantially in different parts of Virginia.

Nearly all Group AAA schools were located in Northern Virginia, Hampton Roads, and Greater Richmond, with a few outliers in the Roanoke, Lynchburg, and Danville areas. Group A schools were typically found in rural areas, with the largest concentration in Southwest Virginia. Group AA schools were somewhat more widely distributed than the other two, and found in rapidly growing areas like Loudoun County, in and around cities such as Roanoke, Lynchburg, Harrisonburg, and Charlottesville, and in some cities and counties which have a single high school. Unlike many state associations, districts and regions were the same for every sport with few exceptions.

Redistricting and regrouping occurred every two years. Group AAA schools typically had enrollments above 1,500 students, Group AA schools typically had from 700 to about 1,500 students, and Group A schools had fewer than 700 students. Schools could request to play up a group. Several schools in the Richmond and Hampton Roads areas competed in the Central and Eastern Regions of Group AAA instead of Group AA due to a reluctance to travel long distances in the post-season. In Southwest Virginia, some schools with Group A enrollment levels competed in Group AA due to traditionally being part of that group. Lee High School in Jonesville received a special dispensation from the VHSL to play in Group A despite having Group AA enrollment numbers due to being far away from the nearest schools in Group AA and not having substantially more students than large Group A schools.

In football, each region was further split into two divisions based on school enrollment, so statewide champions were determined in Divisions 1 through 6. Divisions 1 and 2 were for Group A with Division 2 being the one for schools with larger enrollments; 3 and 4, the Group AA schools; and 5 and 6, the Group AAA schools. The division format was first adopted in 1986 for football and was expanded in the late 2000s and early 2010s to some other sports in Groups A and AA.

Since the average enrollments of schools varied by region in each group, some schools in one region had enrollments which would have placed them in the different division of another region. Most districts contained members in both divisions of its group, and a single district had two state championship teams on a few occasions. Because of the number of schools choosing to play up, in some years a state championship team from a lower division had a greater enrollment than a state championship team in a higher division.

=== 2013 classification expansion, basis for post-season competition ===
In the 2013-2014 school year, the former three group classification system was replaced by a six group classification system with Group 1A schools having the smallest enrollments and Group 6A schools having the largest enrollments. Generally, schools which had competed in Group A have been assigned to the new Groups 1A and 2A; in Group AA, the new Groups 3A and 4A; and in Group AAA, the new Groups 5A and 6A. Unlike the former system, the VHSL intends that the group classifications will remain approximately the same size, and schools will not be allowed to compete for a state championship in a group classification above or below the one determined by their enrollment. Regrouping will occur every two years.

Many schools which had competed at the former Group AAA level, particularly in the Central and Eastern Regions, have been assigned to Groups 4A or 3A. To a lesser extent, some smaller schools from the former Group AA have been assigned to Group 2A, a few larger school from the former Group A to Group 3A, and some larger schools from the former Group AA, particularly in Loudoun County, to Group 5A.

The district system largely based on the prior group classifications has been retained for regular season competition and districts may now include schools from different group classifications to maintain local rivalries and minimize travel during the regular season. Some Group AAA and AA districts with few schools and which were geographically isolated from other districts in the same group were dissolved and their member schools assigned to districts of nearby schools with smaller enrollments.

Schools are not required to play a district rival which is at least three group classifications higher. For example, a school in Group 3A is not required to play against a school in Group 6A but is required to play against schools in Groups 5A and 4A. In some cases, no district championship is awarded when there is not a full round robin schedule of all district teams.

Schools have also been assigned to a conference of schools from the same group classification for the first round of post-season competition. There are a total of 48 conferences, designated by numbers in reverse order of the group classification numbers. (i.e. Conference 1 is in Group 6A while Conference 48 is in Group 1A.) Conferences are not uniform in the number of the member schools and almost always include schools in other districts. Only two conferences are composed solely of the members of one district. There are no uniform rules for the seeding of schools in conference competition based on regular season results.

The six groups are not divided into four regions as before. Instead, each group classification is divided into two regions of four conferences each. The two regions are designated North/South in Groups 6A, 5A, and 4A and East/West in Groups 3A, 2A, and 1A. In most team sports, the top two teams from conference playoffs advance to compete in regional playoffs. The top two teams from regional playoffs advance to a final four state playoff competition to determine the state champion.

The conferences are not used for football playoffs in ten of the twelve regions. Instead, the sixteen schools with the most VHSL points from each region compete in the regional playoffs. The exception is that the first three rounds of the playoffs in the South regions in Groups 6A and 5A are split into two sections of two conferences each with eight schools qualifying for the playoffs in each section. The two sectional champions meet for the regional championship in the fourth round.

In Groups 6A, 5A, and 4A, the two regional champions play for the state championship. (i.e. The regional championship game is also the state semi-final.) In Groups 3A, 2A, and 1A, the final four teams are cross-bracketed in the state semi-finals with the higher remaining seed in one region hosting the lower remaining seed in the other region. (i.e. No regional championship is awarded.) This format could allow two teams from the same region to play for the state championship.

== 2023 Classification: Classes, Regions, and Districts ==
The Virginia High School League (VHSL) classifies its member schools based on student enrollment figures to ensure fair and balanced competition. As of the 2023–2024 academic year, schools are divided into six classifications, with Class 1 comprising the smallest schools and Class 6 the largest. Each classification is further divided into four regions (A, B, C, D). For regular-season play, schools are organized into geographically based districts to minimize travel and maintain local rivalries. Postseason competition progresses from regional tournaments to state championships.

=== Classification Breakdown by Enrollment ===
- Class 1: 475 students or fewer
- Class 2: 476–735 students
- Class 3: 736–1,060 students
- Class 4: 1,061–1,340 students
- Class 5: 1,341–1,650 students
- Class 6: 1,651 students or more

These enrollment ranges are determined using the March 31 average daily membership (ADM) figures submitted by school divisions to the Virginia Department of Education.

=== Regional and District Alignment ===
Each classification is divided into four regions to facilitate postseason play:

- Region A
- Region B
- Region C
- Region D

Within these regions, schools are grouped into districts based on geographic proximity. This structure is designed to reduce travel time and costs during the regular season while maintaining traditional rivalries. District alignments are reviewed and updated regularly to reflect changes in enrollment and school development.

== Alignment Changes Since 2023 ==
The Virginia High School League (VHSL) updates its classification and regional alignment plans every four years based on student enrollment (ADM) and other criteria. The most recent cycle, adopted for the 2023–24 through 2026–27 school years, included several classification shifts, new region configurations, and mid-cycle district changes. The following is a summary of major adjustments since 2023:

=== Classification Changes ===
Several schools were moved between classifications based on updated ADM numbers:

- Matoaca High School, Hickory High School, and Colonial Forge High School moved up from Class 4 to Class 5 or 6 due to increased enrollment.
- Sherando High School, Monticello High School, and Mecklenburg County High School were reclassified downward to Class 4 or Class 3.

=== 2023–2027 Region Alignment Plan ===
The full region realignment, adopted in 2023 and effective through 2027, impacted all classifications:

- Class 6: Aligned into four regions (A–D), with 59 schools total, including additions like Alexandria City, Thomas Jefferson S/T, and John R. Lewis in Region C.
- Class 5: Includes 48 schools across Regions A–D, with realignments shifting schools such as Matoaca, Independence, and Lightridge.
- Class 4: With 51 schools, notably added Churchland and Manor to Region A and expanded Region B to 17 schools.
- Class 3: Saw reassignments such as Heritage (Newport News) and Lafayette to Region A, with Rocktown High School entering Region C in 2025–26.
- Classes 2 and 1: Maintained four-region formats but introduced new schools such as Smith Mountain Lake Christian Academy (Class 1, Region C) and reclassified smaller schools like Armstrong (Class 2, Region A).

=== Mid-Cycle District Adjustments (2025–2027) ===
In 2024, VHSL approved mid-cycle district alignment updates for the 2025–26 and 2026–27 seasons. These include:

- Creation of new districts, such as the Commonwealth District under Class 6, Region B.
- Rebalancing of existing districts, including the Peninsula and Southeastern Districts absorbing new Class 5 and 6 schools.
- District shifts to reduce travel, such as South County and Alexandria City moving into districts with geographically closer schools.

=== Notable Trends ===
- The increasing size of suburban Northern Virginia schools led to a growing concentration of Class 6 programs in Regions B and C.
- Some rural and exurban schools moved down in classification to better match enrollment and competitive equity.
- Academic-only schools, such as the Appomattox Regional Governor’s School, remained aligned in special districts for competition purposes.

== Athletic activities ==
The Virginia High School League (VHSL) sanctions a variety of interscholastic athletic activities for public high schools throughout the Commonwealth of Virginia. These sports are governed by VHSL rules and are contested at the district, regional, and state levels.

Athletic activities are categorized into boys’, girls’, and coed teams. While many sports are offered with separate boys’ and girls’ teams, VHSL policy permits cross-gender participation when an equivalent team is not available.

=== Coed sports (offered for both boys and girls) ===
- Basketball
- Cross country running
- Golf
- Lacrosse
- Indoor track and field
- Outdoor track and field
- Soccer
- Swimming and diving
- Tennis
- Volleyball
- Esports (pilot and invitational programs)

=== Boys-only sports ===
- Football
- Baseball

=== Girls-only sports ===
- Field hockey
- Softball
- Cheerleading (sideline and competitive)

=== Wrestling ===
Wrestling is sanctioned as a competitive sport for both boys and girls by the VHSL. While boys wrestling has long been a part of VHSL programs, girls wrestling was officially sanctioned as a separate championship sport beginning in 2025. Prior to full sanctioning, girls competed in emerging or open divisions. The inaugural VHSL Girls Wrestling State Championship was held in February 2025.

=== Unified Sports ===
VHSL supports inclusive athletic programs such as Special Olympics Unified Sports, which allow students with and without intellectual disabilities to compete together. These programs are offered in partnership with Special Olympics Virginia.

=== Gender Inclusion Policy ===
In accordance with federal Title IX guidelines and VHSL policy, students are permitted to try out for sports teams typically designated for the opposite gender when no corresponding team is offered by their school. This applies to all VHSL-sanctioned athletic programs across Virginia.

== Academic activities ==
The Virginia High School League (VHSL) sanctions a broad range of academic competitions that promote scholastic achievement, public speaking, journalism, and critical thinking among high school students across the Commonwealth of Virginia. These activities are coeducational and typically recognized separately from varsity athletics, with their own honors, awards, and championship events.

=== Sanctioned Activities ===
VHSL academic activities include:

- Creative writing
- Debate
- Drama (One-Act Play)
- Forensics (Speech)
- Publications: Newspapers, Magazines, Yearbooks, Online Media, and Broadcast Journalism
- Scholastic Bowl
- Esports (pilot/invitational)
- Film Festival
- Robotics (STEM Showcase)

=== Journalism and Publications ===
VHSL sponsors annual media championships and journalism workshops for student newspapers, yearbooks, and broadcast programs. The competitions evaluate content quality, writing, photography, and design. Collaborating with the Virginia Association of Journalism Teachers and Advisers (VAJTA), VHSL hosts state-level recognition through the VHSL Media Championships.

=== One-Act Play (Drama) ===
The VHSL One-Act Theatre Championships are held in winter and early spring and are divided by classification:

- Classes 1–2: Western Albemarle High School, December 14, 2024
- Classes 3–4: PVCC V. Earl Dickinson Building (Charlottesville), December 7, 2024
- Classes 5–6: PVCC V. Earl Dickinson Building, March 8, 2025

=== Forensics (Speech) ===
The VHSL Forensics State Championships are scheduled for March 29, 2025, at Salem High School. Events include duo interpretation, original oratory, storytelling, poetry, prose, extemporaneous speaking (domestic and foreign), and impromptu.

=== Debate ===
VHSL hosts a two-day state debate tournament in April. Events include:

- Lincoln-Douglas
- Policy
- Public Forum (added in 2011)
- Student Congress

The 2025 Debate State Championship is scheduled for April 26 at James Madison University.

=== Creative Writing ===
Each school submits a folder containing six works (2 poems, 2 short stories, 2 essays) from six different students. The contest is judged by faculty and writers from the University of Virginia’s creative writing program. Awards include individual recognition and best overall school folder by group (1–6).

=== Scholastic Bowl ===
The VHSL Scholastic Bowl is a quiz-bowl competition featuring questions in math, science, social studies, English, current events, fine arts, and general trivia. Teams of four compete in regional rounds leading to a state championship, which will be held at the College of William and Mary.

=== Awards and honors ===
Several major awards are given in recognition of academic excellence:

- Claudia Dodson Sportsmanship, Ethics, and Integrity Award – awarded to schools with exemplary conduct in VHSL activities.
- Savedge Scholarship Award – a $500 scholarship awarded to the top senior student journalist annually.
- National Guard Cup – awarded to the top academic school in each classification, based on cumulative performance across all academic activities (formerly known as the Wachovia Cup).

== Districts ==
Districts are geographically-organized groups and may contain schools in varying classifications.

- Capital District
- Central District
- Colonial District
- Dominion District
- Beach District
- Eastern District
- Peninsula District
- Southeastern District
- Concorde District
- Gunston District
- Liberty District
- National District
- Patriot District
- Cardinal District
- Cedar Run District
- Commonwealth District
- Battlefield District
- Bay Rivers District
- Southside District
- Dulles District
- Potomac District
- Jefferson District
- Northwestern District
- Blue Ridge District
- Seminole District
- Valley District
- Piedmont District
- River Ridge District
- Eastern Shore District
- Northern Neck District
- Tidewater District
- Tri-Rivers District
- Bull Run District
- Dogwood District
- James River District
- Shenandoah District
- Hogoheegee District
- Mountain Empire District
- Pioneer District
- Three Rivers District
- Black Diamond District
- Cumberland District
- Mountain District
- Southwest District

== Regions ==
Class 6

- Region A
- Region B
- Region C
- Region D

Class 5

- Region A
- Region B
- Region C
- Region D

Class 4

- Region A
- Region B
- Region C
- Region D

Class 3

- Region A
- Region B
- Region C
- Region D

Class 2

- Region A
- Region B
- Region C
- Region D

Class 1

- Region A
- Region B
- Region C
- Region D
