= List of general officers of the United States Army Medical Department in World War II =

During World War II, 73 officers of the United States Army Medical Department were promoted to general officer. All are listed below with their dates of rank, most notable duty assignment during the war, and their status as of late 1946. Notes also provide other notable achievements as well as any special commemorative actions taken by the United States Army to recognize their service.

| Image | Rank | Name | Date of Rank | Status in December 1946 | Notes |
|---|---|---|---|---|---|
| James C. Magee | Major General | James C. Magee | June 1, 1939 | Retired 1943 | Surgeon General of the Army |
| Norman T. Kirk | Major General | Norman T. Kirk | June 1, 1943 | Surgeon General of the Army | Namesake of Kirk United States Army Health Clinic (formerly hospital), Aberdeen Proving Ground, Maryland |
| Shelley U. Marietta | Major General | Shelley U. Marietta | September 13, 1943 | Retired 1946 | Commander of The Army Medical Center |
| Robert H. Mills | Major General | Robert H. Mills | September 17, 1943 | Retired 1946 | Chief, Army Dental Corps; Namesake of Mills Dental Clinic, Fort Dix, New Jersey |
| David N. W. Grant | Major General | David N. W. Grant | September 19, 1943 | Retired 1946 | The Air Surgeon; Namesake of David Grant USAF Medical Center, Travis Air Force Base, California |
| Albert W. Kenner | Major General | Albert W. Kenner | September 23, 1943 | Office of the Secretary of War | Chief Surgeon, Supreme Headquarters, Allied Expeditionary Force from February 1944; Namesake of Kenner Army Health Clinic (formerly hospital), Fort Lee, Virginia |
| George F. Lull | Major General | George F. Lull | September 24, 1943 | Retired 1945 | Deputy Surgeon General |
| Howard McCrum Snyder | Major General | Howard McCrum Snyder | November 3, 1943 | Retired 1945 | Assistant to the Inspector General of the Army; later personal physician to President Dwight David Eisenhower |
| Morrison C. Stayer | Major General | Morrison C. Stayer | November 3, 1943 | Retired 1946 | Chief Surgeon Caribbean Command; Chief Surgeon, North African Theater of Operations; Chief of Public Health & Welfare Officer Allied Military Government Germany |
| George C. Dunham | Major General | George C. Dunham | February 22, 1944 | Retired 1945 | Author of Textbook of Military Preventive Medicine; Director of Health & Sanitation Division, Institute of Inter-American Affairs; Namesake of Dunham Army Health Clinic, Carlisle Barracks, Pennsylvania |
| Paul R. Hawley | Major General | Paul R. Hawley | February 27, 1944 | Retired 1946 | Chief Surgeon, European Theater of Operations; Later Chief Medical Officer, United States Veterans' Administration; Namesake of Hawley Army Community Hospital (closed 1995), Fort Benjamin Harrison, Indiana |
| Wallace C. Dewitt, Sr. | Brigadier General | Wallace DeWitt, Sr. | October 2, 1936 | Relieved from active duty February 28, 1945; | Retired June 30, 1942 and recalled to active duty on July 1, 1942; Namesake of DeWitt Army Community Hospital (closed 2011), Fort Belvoir, Virginia |
| Raymonf F. Metcalfe | Brigadier General | Raymond F. Metcalfe | December 15, 1937 | Relieved from Active Duty 1946 | Retired May 31, 1941 and recalled to active duty on December 15, 1941 |
| Leigh C. Fairbanks | Brigadier General | Leigh C. Fairbanks | January 29, 1938 | Retired 1942 | First General officer in Dental Corps and Chief, Dental Corps; Namesake of Fairbanks Dental Clinic, Fort Hood, Texas |
| William L. Sheep | Brigadier General | William L. Sheep | October 1, 1940 | Retired 1945 | Commanding General, Lawson General Hospital, Atlanta, Georgia |
| Addison D. Davis | Brigadier General | Addison D. Davis | December 19, 1940 | Retired 1946 | Commandant, Medical Field Service School, Carlisle Barracks, Pennsylvania |
| Larry B. McAfee | Brigadier General | Larry B. McAfee | March 1, 1941 | Retired 1946 | Executive Officer to the Surgeon General; Assistant Surgeon General; Commanding General, Bruns General Hospital, Santa Fe, New Mexico |
| Henry C. Pillsbury | Brigadier General | Henry C. Pillsbury | April 3, 1941 | Retired May 31, 1945 | Commanding General, Lovell General Hospital, Fort Devens, Massachusetts |
| Henry C. Coburn, Jr. | Brigadier General | Henry C. Coburn, Jr. | April 3, 1941 | Relieved from Active Duty, 1945 | Retired 1943; recalled to active duty; Surgeon, Fort Bragg Station Hospital |
| William R. Dear | Brigadier General | William R. Dear | April 4, 1941 | Retired 1946 | Commanding General, Medical Replacement Training Center, Camp Lee Virginia; Commanding General, Medical Replacement Training Center, Camp Pickett, Virginia (same unit, relocated from Camp Lee to Camp Pickett due to space issues); Commanding General, Northington General Hospital, Tuscaloosa, Alabama |
| John M. Willis | Brigadier General | John M. Willis | April 5, 1941 | Commanding General, Brooke Army Medical Center | Command Surgeon, United States Army Pacific Ocean Areas; Namesake of Willis Hall, United States Army Medical Department Center and School, Fort Sam Houston, Texas |
| Roy C. Heflebower | Brigadier General | Roy C. Heflebower | December 15, 1941 | Retired 1946 | Commander, Medical Replacement Training Center, Camp Barkeley, Texas |
| Charles C. Hillman | Brigadier General | Charles C. Hillman | January 29, 1942 | Commanding General, Letterman General Hospital | Chief of Professional Service Division, Office of the Surgeon General |
| James E. Baylis | Brigadier General | James E. Baylis | February 13, 1942 | Command Surgeon, Seventh United States Army | Command Surgeon, India-Burma Theater |
| Raymond A. Kelser | Brigadier General | Raymond A. Kelser | March 9, 1942 | Retired 1946 | Chief, Veterinary Corps |
| Royal Reynolds | Brigadier General | Royal Reynolds | March 20, 1942 | Retired 1945 | Commanding General, Kennedy General Hospital, Memphis, Tennessee; Brother of Charles R. Reynolds, former Surgeon General of the Army from 1935 to 1939 |
| Omar H. Quade | Brigadier General | Omar H. Quade | May 21, 1942 | Commanding General, Fitzsimmons General Hospital | Commanding General, Fitzsimmons General Hospital |
| Frank W. Weed | Brigadier General | Frank W. Weed | July 19, 1942 | Retired April 30, 1945; Died September 29, 1945 | Commanding General, Letterman General Hospital, Presidio of San Francisco, California; Namesake of Weed Army Community Hospital, Fort Irwin, California |
| Edgar King | Brigadier General | Edgar King | October 25, 1942 | Retired 1946 | Command Surgeon, United States Army Forces, Central Pacific |
| Frederick A. Blesse | Brigadier General | Frederick A. Blesse | December 4, 1942 | Command Surgeon, Army Ground Forces, Fort Monroe, Virginia | Command Surgeon, Fifth United States Army Namesake of Blesse Auditorium, United States Army Medical Department Center and School, Fort Sam Houston, Texas |
| Eugen G. Reinartz | Brigadier General | Eugen G. Reinartz | December 4, 1942 | Retired 1946 | Commandant, School of Aviation Medicine, Randolph Field, Texas |
| Hugh J. Morgan | Brigadier General | Hugh J. Morgan | December 4, 1942 | Relieved from Active Duty 1946 | Mobilized reservist; Chief consultant in Medicine, Office of the Surgeon General |
| Fred W. Rankin | Brigadier General | Fred W. Rankin | December 5, 1942 | Relieved from Active Duty 1945 | Mobilized reservist; Chief Consultant in Surgery, Office of the Surgeon General |
| James S. Simmons | Brigadier General | James S. Simmons | March 14, 1943 | Retired 1946 | Mobilized Reservist; Chief, Preventive Medicine Division, Office of the Surgeon General |
| Leon A. Fox | Brigadier General | Leon A. Fox | March 16, 1943 | Retired 1946 | United States of America Typhus Commission |
| Ralph H. Goldthwaite | Brigadier General | Ralph H. Goldthwaite | April 25, 1943 | Retired 1946 | Commanding General, Army and Navy General Hospital, Hot Springs, Arkansas |
| George C. Beach, Jr. | Brigadier General | George C. Beach, Jr. | April 26, 1943 | Commanding General, The Army Medical Center | Commanding General, Brooke Army Medical Center, Fort Sam Houston, Texas |
| Joseph E. Bastion | Brigadier General | Joseph E. Bastion | June 23, 1943 | Commanding General, Percy Jones General Hospital, Battle Creek, Michigan | Commanding General, Percy Jones General Hospital, Battle Creek, Michigan |
| Percy J. Carroll | Brigadier General | Percy J. Carroll | June 23, 1943 | Retired 1946 | Command Surgeon, United States Army Forces in Australia; Command Surgeon, United States Army Forces in the Southwest Pacific; Commanding General, Vaughn General Hospital, Hines, Illinois |
| Raymond W. Bliss | Brigadier General | Raymond W. Bliss | September 13, 1943 | Deputy Surgeon General | Chief of Operations, Office of the Surgeon General; Surgeon General of the Army, 1947–1951; namesake of Raymond W. Bliss Army Health Center (former hospital), Fort Huachuca, Arizona |
| Charles R. Glenn | Brigadier General | Charles R. Glenn | September 17, 1943 | Air Materiel Command Surgeon, Wright Field, Ohio | Army Air Forces Training Command Surgeon; Deputy Air Surgeon |
| Malcolm C. Grow | Brigadier General | Malcolm C. Grow | September 17, 1943 | The Air Surgeon | First Surgeon General of the United States Air Force; namesake of Malcolm Grow Medical Clinic (formerly medical center), Joint Base Andrews, Camp Spring, Maryland |
| James A. Bethea | Brigadier General | James A. Bethea | November 3, 1943 | Chief Surgeon, Far East Command | Commanding General, McCloskey General Hospital, Temple, Texas |
| Edgar Erskine Hume | Brigadier General | Edgar Erskine Hume | January 14, 1944 | Civil Affairs, Austria | Commanding Officer, Winter General Hospital, Topeka, Kansas |
| Joseph I. Martin | Brigadier General | Joseph I. Martin | January 17, 1944 | Brooke Army Medical Center | Command Surgeon, Fifth United States Army; namesake of Martin Army Community Hospital, Fort Benning, Georgia |
| Guy B. Denit | Brigadier General | Guy Blair Denit | January 18, 1944 | Office of the Surgeon General | Chief Surgeon, United States Army Services of Supply, Southwest Pacific Area; Chief Surgeon, United States Army Forces Far East, Chief Surgeon, US European Command (1948-1951) |
| Earl Maxwell | Brigadier General | Earl Maxwell | January 19, 1944 | Chief, Eye, Ear, Nose, and Throat Service, Letterman General Hospital, Presidio of San Francisco, California | Chief Surgeon, United States Army Forces, Pacific; Commanding General, 332nd Hospital Center, Okinawa; Chief Surgeon, United States Army Service Command, Yokohama |
| Stanhope Bayne-Jones | Brigadier General | Stanhope Bayne-Jones | February 25, 1944 | Relieved from active duty, 1946 | Mobilized reservist; administrator for the United States Typhus Commission and the Army Epidemiology Board; Member of the 1964 Surgeon General's Advisory Committee on Smoking and Health; Namesake of Bayne-Jones Army Community Hospital, Fort Polk, Louisiana |
| Condon C. McCornack | Brigadier General | Condon C. McCornack | May 31, 1944 | Died November 5, 1944 | Deputy Command Surgeon, Western Defense Command; namesake of McCornack General Hospital (closed 1949), Pasadena, California |
| George B. Foster, Jr. | Brigadier General | George B. Foster, Jr. | May 24, 1944 | Retired 1946 | Commanding General, O'Reilly General Hospital, Springfield, Missouri |
| Ralph G. DeVoe | Brigadier General | Ralph G. DeVoe | May 24, 1944 | Retired 1946 | Commanding Officer, Halloran General Hospital, Willowbrook, Staten Island, New York |
| | Brigadier General | Henry C. Dooling | May 25, 1944 | Chief Health Officer, Canal Zone | Assistant Chief Health Officer, Canal Zone |
| John A. Rogers | Brigadier General | John A. Rogers | November 10, 1944 | Retired 1946 | Command Surgeon, First United States Army |
| Robert C. McDonald | Brigadier General | Robert C. McDonald | January 1, 1945 | Relieved from active duty 1946 | Retired 1945; recalled to active duty; namesake of McDonald Army Health Clinic (former hospital), Fort Eustis, Virginia |
| William A. Hagins | Brigadier General | William A. Hagins | January 4, 1945 | Surgeon, Sixth United States Army | Command Surgeon, Sixth United States Army |
| Rex McKinley McDowell | Brigadier General | Rex McKinley McDowell | January 4, 1945 | Headquarters, Sixth United States Army, Presidio of San Francisco, California | Dental Corps Officer, Deputy Chief, Dental Division, Office of the Surgeon General |
| Charles B. Spruit | Brigadier General | Charles B. Spruit | January 8, 1945 | Retired 1946 | Deputy Command Surgeon, United States Army European Theater of Operations |
| William Lee Hart | Brigadier General | W. Lee Hart | March 16, 1945 | Relieved from active duty 1946 | Retired 1945; Command Surgeon, Eighth Service Command |
| George R. Callender | Brigadier General | George R. Callender | March 16, 1945 | Retired 1946 | Commandant, Army Medical School, Washington, D.C. |
| Thomas D. Hurley | Brigadier General | Thomas D. Hurley | March 20, 1945 | Retired 1946 | Chief Surgeon, Third United States Army |
| Isidor S. Radvin | Brigadier General | Isidor S. Radvin | March 31, 1945 | Relieved from Active Duty 1946 | Mobilized reservist; Commanding Officer, 20th General Hospital, India |
| Charles M. Walson | Brigadier General | Charles M. Walson | June 3, 1945 | Command Surgeon, First United States Army, Governors Island, New York | Surgeon, Second Service Command; namesake of Walson Army Community Hospital, Fort Dix, New Jersey (closed 1995) |
| George W. Rice | Brigadier General | George W. Rice | June 5, 1945 | Command Surgeon, Second United States Army, Baltimore, Maryland | Command Surgeon, Eighth United States Army |
| Elliot C. Cutler | Brigadier General | Elliot C. Cutler | June 17, 1945 | Relieved from Active Duty 1946 | Mobilized Reserve Officer; Chief surgical consultant to the Command surgeon, European Theater of Operations |
| Edward Reynolds | Brigadier General | Edward Reynolds | June 17, 1945 | Retired 1946 | Chief, Medical Administrative Corps |
| Sidney L. Chappell | Brigadier General | Sidney L. Chappell | September 5, 1945 | Retired 1946 | Commanding Officer, England General Hospital, Atlantic City, New Jersey |
| Robert M. Hardaway | Brigadier General | Robert M. Hardaway | September 5, 1945 | Commanding General Percy Jones Hospital Center | Commanding Officer, Bushnell General Hospital, Brigham City, Utah |
| Edward A. Noyes | Brigadier General | Edward A. Noyes | September 6, 1945 | Chief Surgeon, European Theater | Commanding General, Cushing General Hospital, Framingham, Massachusetts |
| Clyde Mckay Beck | Brigadier General | Clyde McKay Beck | September 5, 1945 | Commanding General, Pratt General Hospital, Miami, Florida | Commanding Officer, Ashford General Hospital, White Sulfur Springs, West Virginia |
| William C. Menninger | Brigadier General | William C. Menninger | September 10, 1945 | Relieved from Active Duty 1946 | Director, Neuropsychiatry Consultants Division, Office of The Surgeon General |
| William W. Vaughan | Brigadier General | William W. Vaughan | October 24, 1945 | Retired 1946 | Commanding General, Stark General Hospital, Charleston, South Carolina |
| Thomas L. Smith | Brigadier General | Thomas L. Smith | March 17, 1946 | Office of the Surgeon General | Tenth Chief of the Dental Corps, advanced to Major General in 1947 |
| Wallace H. Graham | Brigadier General | Wallace H. Graham | September 14, 1946 | Attending physician to the President | Chief Surgeon, 97th Evacuation Hospital |
