= Don McGuire (actor) =

American actor

- Born: Don Rose; February 28, 1919; Chicago, Illinois.
- Died: April 13, 1999 (aged 80); Los Angeles, California
- Occupation(s): Actor, film director, screenwriter, producer
- Years active: 1945–1999
- Spouse: Karen X. Gaylord (1948 - ?)(divorced)
- Parent(s): Mr. and Mrs. Benjamin C. Rose

Don McGuire (born Don Rose; February 28, 1919 – April 13, 1999) was an American actor, director, screenwriter, and producer known for his roles such as playing Congo Bill from DC Comics in the 1948 Congo Bill serial.

== Early years ==
The son of Mr. and Mrs. Benjamin C. Rose, McGuire graduated from Senn High School, where he participated in four sports. Following studies at the University of Iowa, he played semi-pro baseball in Evansville, Indiana, for a year, after which he began working at a newspaper as a copy boy. He progressed from that job to become a photographer and a reporter.

== Career ==
McGuire worked at a newspaper in Chicago but left that job to enlist in the Army in 1941. He was a military police first sergeant, serving in the Aleutian Islands until 1944. Back injuries ended his military service, and when he returned to civilian life, he worked in public relations in Hollywood, eventually opening his own business. While he was trying to secure a film role for his girlfriend, the director offered him a job instead.

McGuire's acting debut came in San Antonio. He went on to act in The Fuller Brush Man and Armored Car Robbery, among other films. While acting, he also worked on several screenplays including Meet Danny Wilson and Bad Day at Black Rock.

In the early 1960s, he created, produced or co-produced, directed, and wrote scripts for the television series Hennesey (1959–1962) and Don't Call Me Charlie! (1962–1963), and he guest-starred as General Nuxhall in the 1962 episode "Play It, Sam" of the latter show. Towards the end of his career, he directed three films: Johnny Concho, The Delicate Delinquent, and Hear Me Good.

== Personal life ==
McGuire married and divorced twice. One of his wives was Karen X. Gaylord, whom he had married on August 15, 1948.

== Death ==
Don McGuire died on April 13, 1999, aged 80, of complications from an unspecified illness, in Los Angeles, California. He was survived by two nieces, Mary Beth Rose and Patty Rose.

== Recognition ==
McGuire was nominated for the Academy Award for Best Original Screenplay for co-writing Tootsie. He won Screenwriters Guild Awards for his work on that film and on Bad Day at Black Rock.
