= General officers in the United States =

High military officers of the United States

A general officer is an officer of high military rank; in the uniformed services of the United States, general officers are commissioned officers above the field officer ranks, the highest of which is colonel in the Army, Marine Corps, Air Force, and Space Force and captain in the Navy, Coast Guard, Public Health Service Commissioned Corps (PHSCC), and National Oceanic and Atmospheric Administration Commissioned Corps (NOAACC).

General officer ranks currently used in the uniformed services are:

- One-star: brigadier general in the Army, Marine Corps, Air Force, and Space Force and rear admiral (lower half) in the Navy, Coast Guard, PHSCC, and NOAACC
- Two-star: major general in the Army, Marine Corps, Air Force, and Space Force and rear admiral in the Navy, Coast Guard, PHSCC, and NOAACC
- Three-star: lieutenant general in the Army, Marine Corps, Air Force, and Space Force and vice admiral in the Navy, Coast Guard, PHSCC, and NOAACC
- Four-star: general in the Army, Marine Corps, Air Force, and Space Force and admiral in the Navy, Coast Guard, PHSCC, and NOAACC

Above these four general-officer ranks are five-star ranks, but these are generally reserved for wartime use. They are the General of the Army (in the Army, equivalent to the foreign rank of field marshal), Fleet Admiral (in the Navy), and General of the Air Force (in the Air Force). Nine Americans have held five-star ranks, but none currently.

The highest ranks, senior to the five-star ranks, are General of the Armies (in the Army) and Admiral of the Navy (in the Navy). These ranks are sometimes called six-star ranks, but holders of the ranks have never used six-star insignia. Only four people have ever held these ranks, which are sometimes considered to be the equivalent of the foreign ranks of generalissimo or grand marshal, and they have never been used at the same time as all other general-officer ranks. The rank of General of the Armies has been held only by John J. Pershing, promoted in 1919, George Washington, promoted posthumously in 1976 as part of American bicentennial celebrations and Ulysses S. Grant, promoted in the 2020s. The rank of Admiral of the Navy has been held only by George Dewey, promoted in 1903 with the date of rank retroactive to 1899. Proposals to bring back these ranks were made during World War II, with Douglas MacArthur and Chester W. Nimitz under consideration for appointment as General of the Armies and Admiral of the Navy, respectively, but this was never implemented.

Throughout much of U.S. history, ranks above three stars were either not used at all, used only on a temporary basis, or only used one at a time, with different titles used at different times for the same rank.

== History ==
=== American Revolutionary War era ===
Henry Knox in the uniform of a major general

During the American Revolutionary War, the Continental Congress appointed general officers to lead the Continental Army. They were usually distinguished community leaders and statesmen, and several had served as general officers in the provincial corps. While there were some general officers who were promoted to the grade from lower ranks, most held their ranks by initial appointment and then with such appointment at the pleasure of the Congress, to be expired or revoked at the end of a particular campaign.

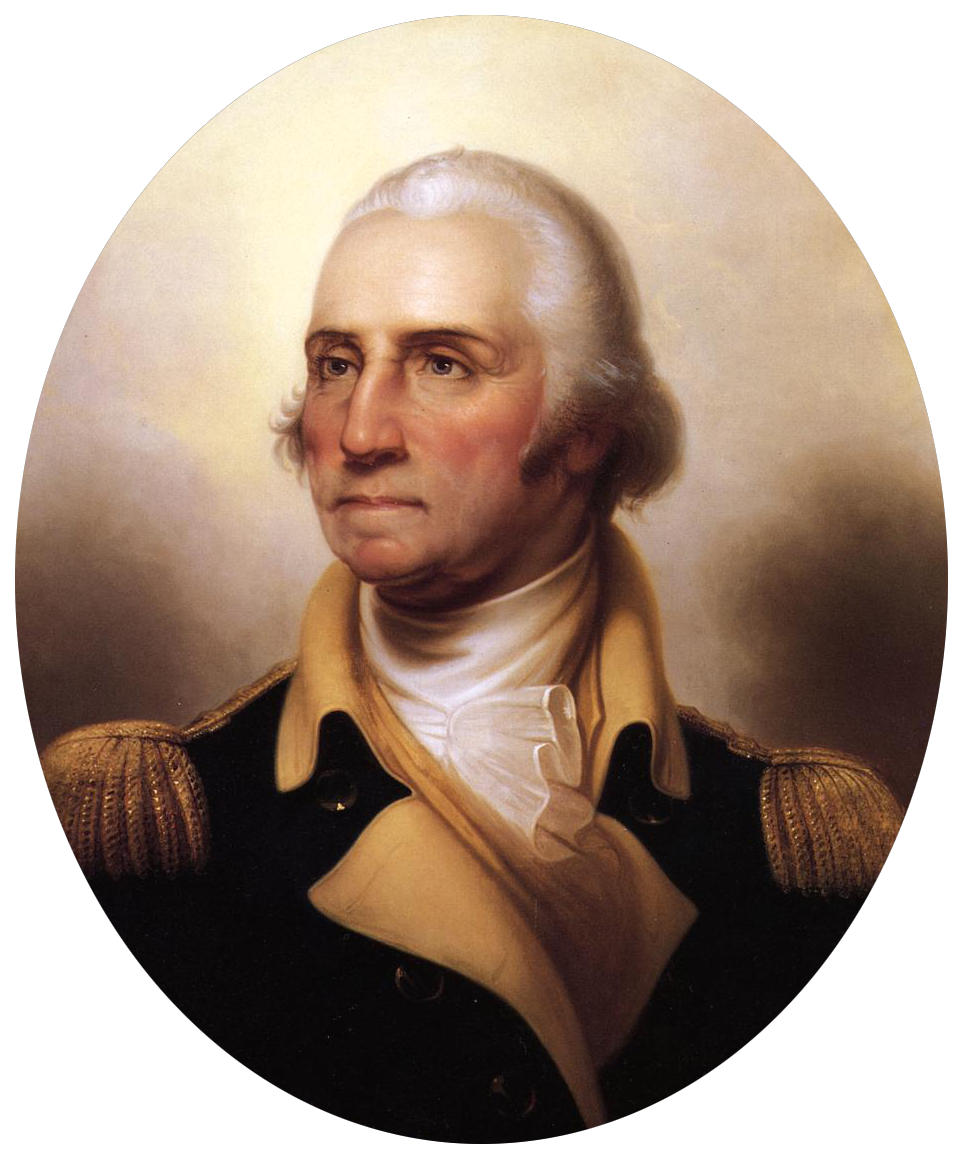
George Washington

With the exception of George Washington, the general officers at that point were brigadier generals or major generals. Their insignia was one or two stars worn on a golden epaulet. Washington was the highest-ranking officer of the Continental Army, holding the title of "General and Commander in Chief" of the Continental Army. He wore three stars on his epaulets.

A year prior to his death, Washington was appointed by President John Adams to the rank of lieutenant general in the United States Army during the Quasi-War with France. Washington never exercised active authority under his new rank, however, and Adams made the appointment to frighten the French, with whom war seemed certain.

In an act of Congress on 3 March 1799, Congress provided "that a Commander of the United States shall be appointed and commissioned by the style of General of the Armies of the United States and the present office and title of Lieutenant General shall thereafter be abolished." The proposed senior general officer rank was not bestowed, however. When George Washington died, he was listed as a lieutenant general on the rolls of the United States Army.

After the Revolutionary War, the tiny United States Army at first had no active duty General Officers. When General Officers were appointed again, the highest rank in the Army was Major General, with the senior Major General on the Army rolls known as the Commanding General of the United States Army. The position was abolished at the start of the 20th century and replaced by that of Chief of Staff of the United States Army.

=== American Civil War era ===
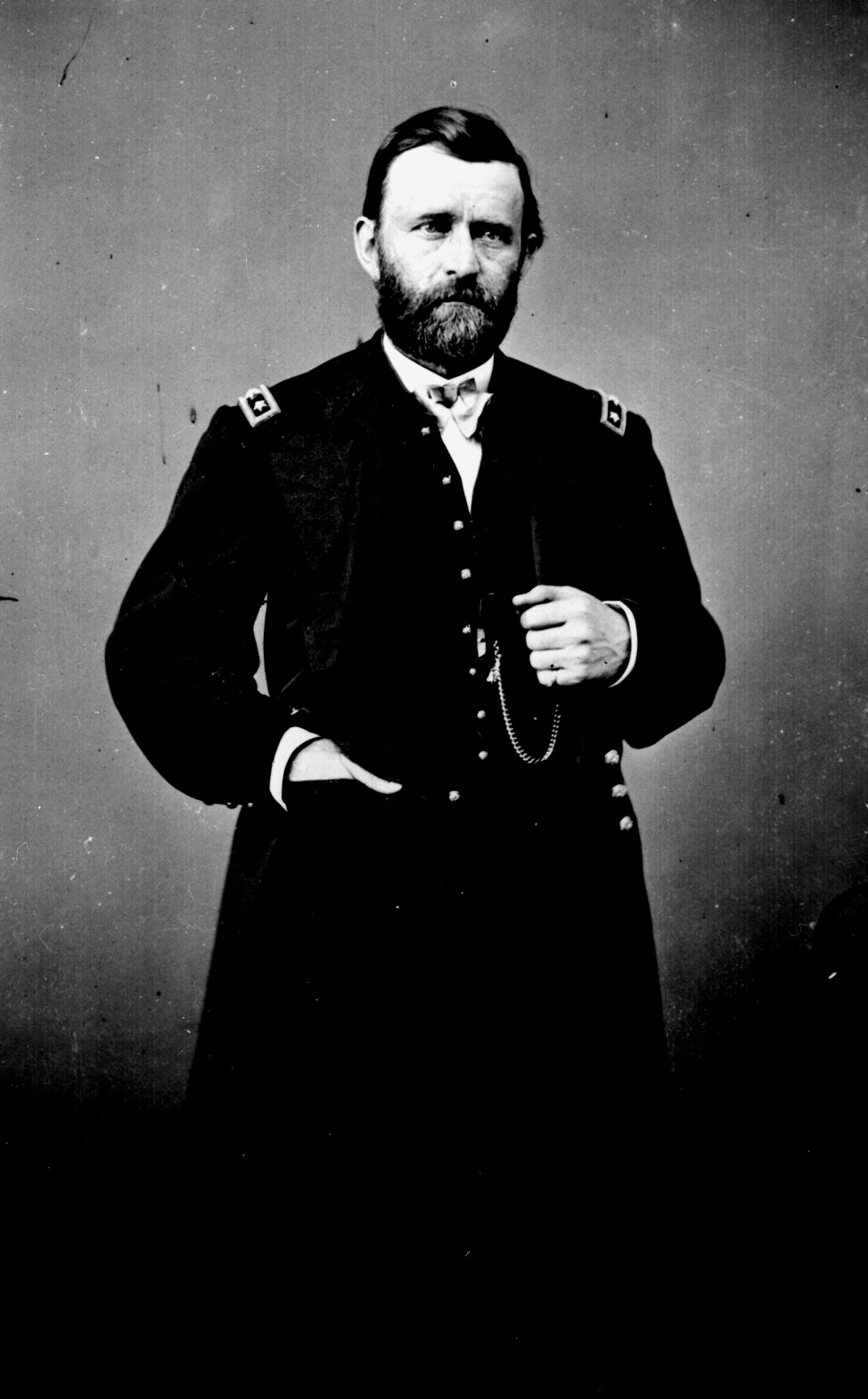
Ulysses Grant in the uniform of a lieutenant general

The rank of lieutenant general remained inactive from the end of the Revolutionary War until the mid-19th century. During the Mexican–American War, President Polk asked Congress to authorize the creation of a lieutenant-general. However, it soon became clear that Polk intended to give this rank to Senator Thomas Hart Benton and place him in charge of the entire war effort—a move that would place Benton, a Democrat and Polk ally, above the two Whig generals who had been conducting the war (Zachary Taylor and Winfield Scott). As a result, Congress refused to authorize this rank.

The rank of lieutenant general was finally created in 1855, when Winfield Scott received a brevet promotion to this rank.

On 13 March 1861, General Order No. 6 said that the position of Major General Commanding the Army was entitled to wear three stars. In 1864, Ulysses S. Grant was appointed lieutenant general and took command of the Union forces. He used the three-star insignia formerly assigned to the position of Major General Commanding the Army.

The Confederate States Army used the rank of lieutenant general for its corps commanders prior to the U.S. Army's adoption of the term. The two ranks were not synonymous. Unlike the Union Army, the Confederate States Army promoted numerous officers to the ranks of Lieutenant General and General (18 and 7, respectively).

In the 19th century, the rank of a U.S. general was also shown by the arrangement of buttons on the coat. This was a feature of the general dress uniform until the Army abandoned blue uniforms during World War I.

On 25 July 1866, the U.S. Congress established the rank of "General of the Army of the United States" for Ulysses S. Grant. When appointed General of the Army, Grant wore the rank insignia of four stars and coat buttons arranged in three groups of four.

Unlike the 1944 rank with a similar title, the 1866 rank of General of the Army was a four-star rank, and as opposed to the current pool of four-star generals, only one officer could hold the 1866–1888 rank of General of the Army at any time.

After Grant retired to become President of the United States, he was succeeded as General of the Army by William T. Sherman, effective 4 March 1869. In 1872, Sherman ordered the insignia changed to two stars with the arms of the United States in between. Sherman wore this insignia during his term as General of the Army of the United States. When Sheridan succeeded him, he re-adopted the four-star insignia which Grant used to wear.

By an Act of 1 June 1888, the grade of lieutenant general was discontinued and merged with that of General of the Army, which was then conferred upon Philip H. Sheridan. (The cover of Sheridan's autobiography was decorated with four stars within a rectangle evocative of the four-star shoulder strap worn by Grant.) The rank of General of the Army ceased to exist upon the death of Sheridan on 5 August 1888, and the highest rank of the United States Army was again the two-star major general rank. Over the next three decades, statute allowed one senior officer to be promoted to Lieutenant General, typically the Commanding General or the Chief of Staff.

General of the Army shoulder strap insignia, 1866–1872 (Grant and Sherman), 1888 (Sheridan)

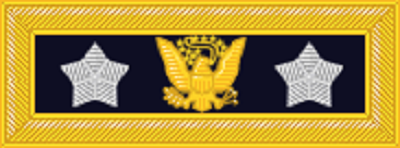
General of the Army shoulder strap insignia, 1872–1888 (worn only by Sherman)

=== World War I era ===
Three-star Lieutenant Generals and four-star Generals were reauthorized temporarily for World War I. Tasker H. Bliss (31 December 1853 – 9 November 1930) and John J. Pershing (13 September 1860 – 15 July 1948) were promoted to General in October 1917. Peyton C. March was promoted to General in May 1918. Hunter Liggett and Robert Lee Bullard were promoted to Lieutenant General on 16 October 1918. On 3 September 1919, Pub. L. 66–45 granted Pershing the rank of "General of the Armies of the United States" in recognition of his performance as the commander of the American Expeditionary Force. Pershing was authorized to create his insignia for the new rank and chose to wear four gold stars for the rest of his career, which distinguished his insignia from the four (temporary) silver stars worn by Army Chiefs of Staff of the 1910s and early 1920s. After the war, in 1920, the Lieutenant Generals and Generals reverted to their permanent ranks of Major General, except for Pershing. Pershing retired from the United States Army on 13 September 1924, and retained his rank of General of the Armies of the United States until his death in 1948. He was later considered a five or six-star general as the result of the creation of the General of the Army rank in 1944. The rank of general was reauthorized in 1929 as a unique temporary rank of the Army Chief of Staff starting with Charles Pelot Summerall. The main purpose of this was to give the Chief of Staff of the Army, who had been a major general, equal rank with the Chief of Naval Operations, a four-star position since 1916.

=== World War II era ===
Lieutenant Generals were reauthorized on 5 August 1939. Four Lieutenant Generals were authorized as temporary ranks for the commanding generals of the four numbered field armies at the time. Subsequently, the commanding generals of the Panama Canal and Hawaiian departments were raised to lieutenant general as well. The four-star rank of General remained unique to the Chief of Staff, as authorized by the act of 23 February 1929.

During World War II most American Generals held temporary or "theater" appointments in the Army of the United States.

Until the Second World War, the highest Marine Corps general rank was that of Major General, with Thomas Holcomb becoming the first three-star Marine general and Alexander Vandegrift becoming the first four-star Marine general (both on active duty) in history. Vandegrift's rank was awarded after becoming the Commandant of the Marine Corps.

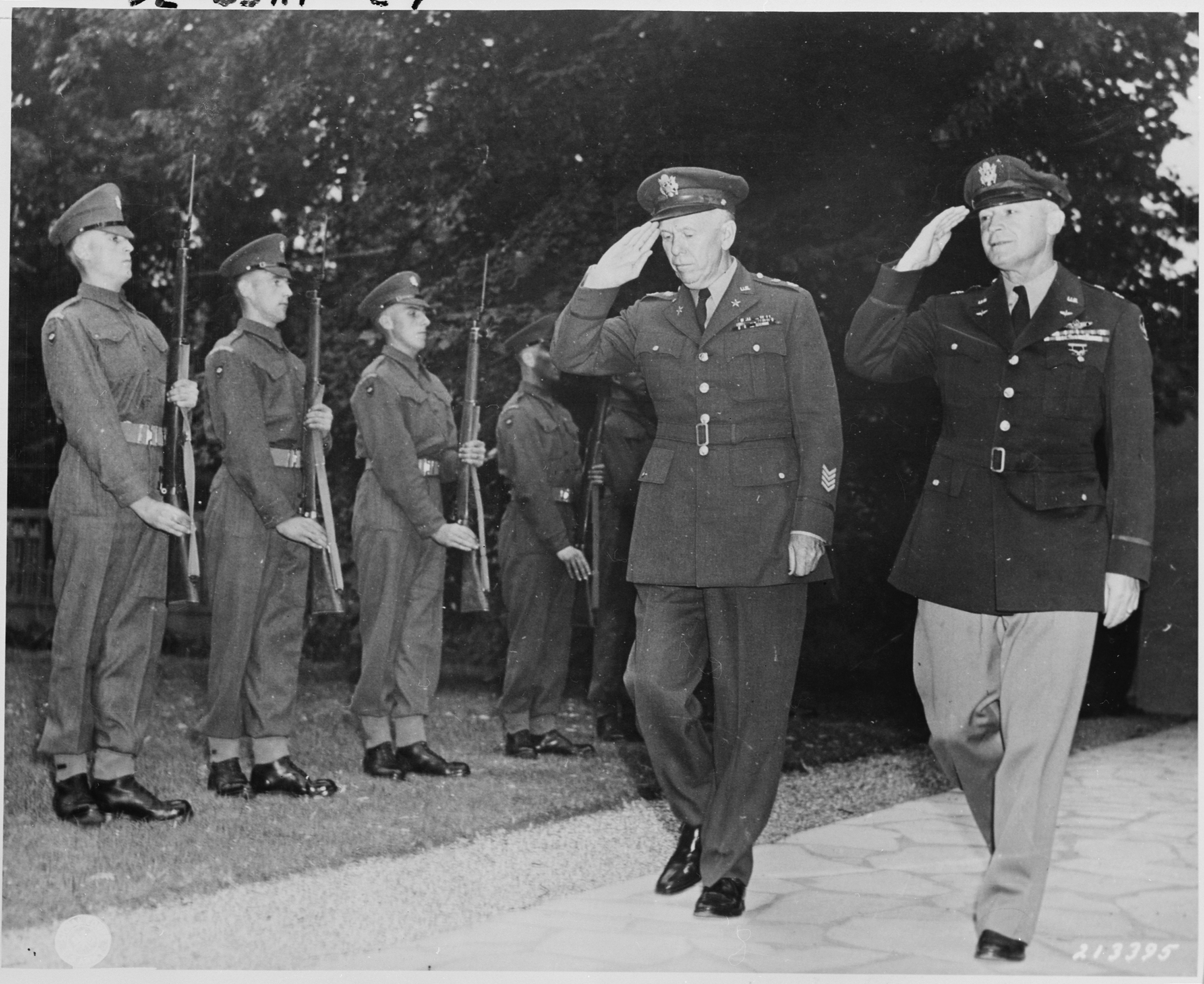
General of the Army George C. Marshall and General of the Army Henry "Hap" Arnold

The second version of General of the Army, colloquially known as a "Five-star General" was created by Pub.L. 78-482 passed on 14 December 1944, first as a temporary rank, then made permanent 23 March 1946, by an act of the 79th Congress. It was created to give the most senior American commanders parity of rank with their British counterparts holding the rank of field marshal. The acts also created a comparable rank of Fleet Admiral for the Navy. This second General of the Army rank is not considered comparable to the American Civil War era version.

The insignia for General of the Army, as created in 1944, consisted of five stars in a pentagonal pattern, with points touching. The five officers who have held the 1944 version of General of the Army were:

•	George C. Marshall	16 December 1944
•	Douglas MacArthur	18 December 1944
•	Dwight D. Eisenhower	20 December 1944
•	Henry H. Arnold	21 December 1944
•	Omar Bradley	20 September 1950

The timing of the first four appointments was coordinated with the appointment of the U.S. Navy's five-star Fleet Admirals (on 15, 17, and 19 December 1944) to establish both a clear order of seniority and a near-equivalence between the services. Arnold was appointed the first, and so far only, General of the Air Force on 7 May 1949, almost three years after he retired from active service.

A historical rumor suggests that the title 'General of the Army' was used instead of the 'Field Marshal' so that George Marshall would not be known as "Marshal Marshall". Most military sources agree that it is more likely that the rank was named after its 19th-century counterpart and was so named because the rank of Field Marshal was considered by the U.S. military to be a European rank.

Dwight Eisenhower resigned his Army commission on 31 May 1952, to run for president. After he served two terms, his successor, John F. Kennedy, signed Pub. L. 87–3 on 23 March 1961, which returned Eisenhower to Active Duty of Regular Army, to the grade of General of the Army grandfathered to December 1944. This rank is today commemorated on the signs denoting Interstate Highways as part of the Eisenhower Interstate System, which display five silver stars on a light blue background.

== Modern use ==
=== Summary ===
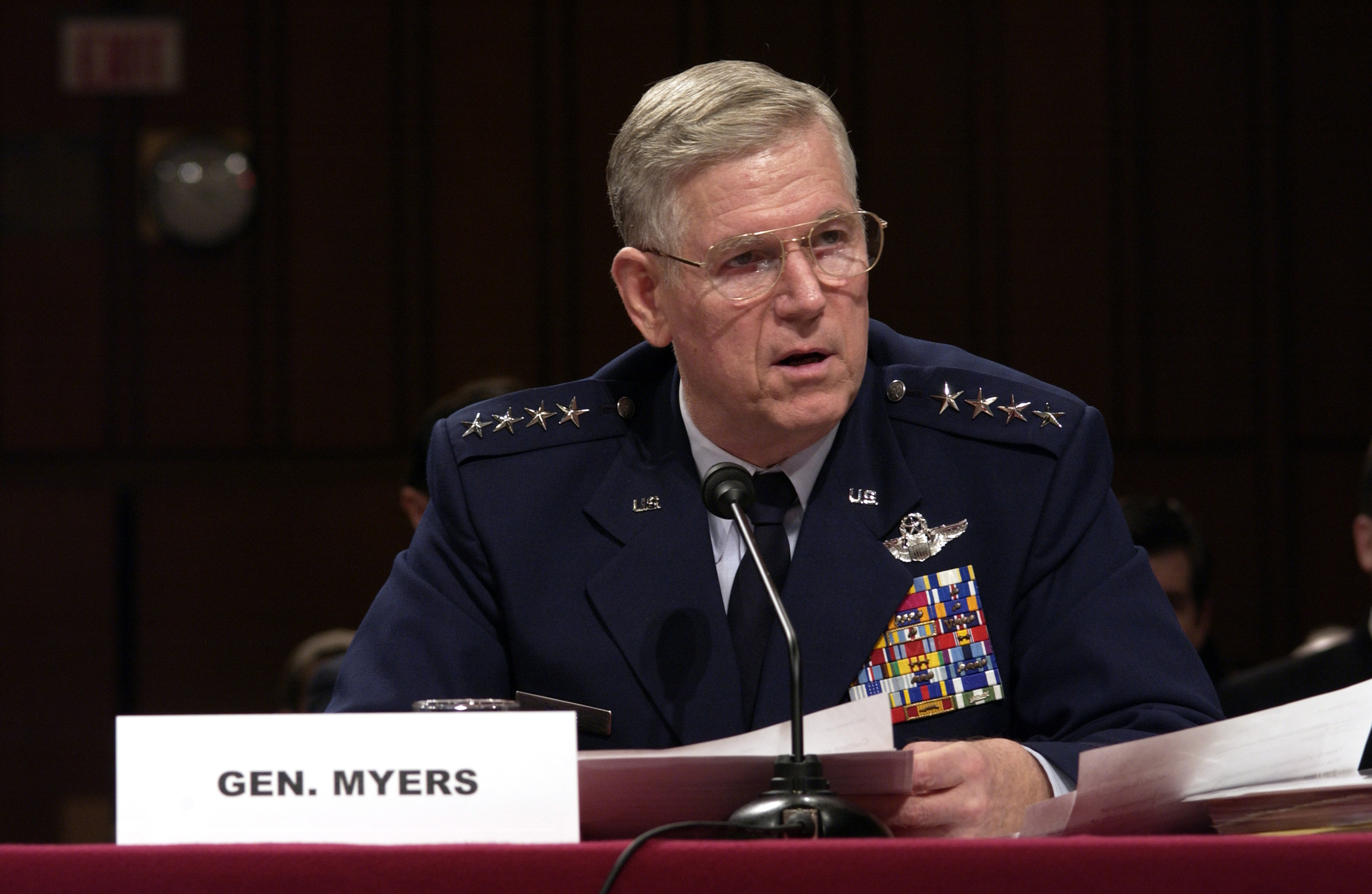
Air Force Four-Star General Richard B. Myers with four-star rank insignia

Official abbreviations below are used in the U.S. Army only. The U.S. Air Force does not abbreviate general officer ranks in signature blocks, but "Brigadier General," "Major General," and "Lieutenant General" (without abbreviating periods) are commonly used.

Insignia	Rank	Description
	Brigadier general	In the Army, a brigadier general typically serves as deputy commander to the commanding general of a division and assists in overseeing the planning and coordination of a mission. In an infantry brigade (4,000 to 6,000 soldiers/marines) not attached to a division, a brigadier general serves as the unit's commander, while a colonel serves as deputy commander. Similarly, in the Air Force, brigadier generals command large operational wings, with colonels serving as deputy commanders. Both services' brigadier generals serve as senior primary staff officers of a corps/Numbered Air Force or higher-level staff. BG and its equivalents currently serve as the commandants and deans of the United States Service Academies.
	Major General	A major general typically commands division-sized units (10,000 to 20,000 soldiers) or serves as the deputy commander of a corps. In the Army, major generals also serve as branch chiefs (i.e.: Infantry, Armor, Quartermaster, etc.), as well as commandants of Army service schools and commanding officers of Army major subordinate commands—for example, the TACOM Life Cycle Management Command (TACOM) and the Army Intelligence and Security Command. In the Air Force, most major generals are deputies or senior staff members of major and joint commands, although a few command smaller Numbered Air Forces.
	Lieutenant general	An Army or Marine Corps lieutenant general typically commands a corps-sized unit (20,000 to 45,000 soldiers), while an Air Force lieutenant general commands a large Numbered Air Force consisting of several wings. Additionally, lieutenant generals of all services serve as high-level staff officers at various major command headquarters and The Pentagon, often as the heads of their departments. The superintendents of the United States service academies are currently LTGs.
	General	A general commands all operations that fall within his geographical area. The Chiefs of Staff of the Army and Air Force, as well as the Commandant of the Marine Corps, are four-star generals. Generals command major areas of responsibility and hold the highest of military positions in the Department of Defense. Air Force generals usually command major commands or unified commands. The Chairman and Vice-Chairman of the Joint Chiefs of Staff are also four-star officers.
	General of the Army; General of the Air Force	This rank is only used in time of war where the commanding officer must be equal to or of higher rank than those commanding armies/air forces from other nations. The last officers to hold this rank served during and immediately following World War II. The Marine Corps does not have an equivalent to this rank.
	General of the Armies	This rank has not been used by an active duty military officer since General Pershing was promoted to the rank in 1919, and subsequently retired in 1924. General Pershing wore four stars in gold instead of silver to distinguish himself from other generals of four-star rank. Pershing is thus the only person who has held this rank during their lifetime. George Washington was posthumously appointed General of the Armies of the United States during the American Bicentennial on October 11, 1976. It was also clarified that Washington's rank would have "precedence over all other grades of the Army, past or present."

=== Elaboration ===
After the close of the Second World War, Generals were normally promoted permanently to Brigadier General and Major General, with temporary promotions to Lieutenant General and General to fill senior positions as needed. In theory, a General would be expected to vacate their three- or four-star rank at the termination of their assignment, unless they were placed in an equal or higher-ranking billet. Douglas MacArthur, who served as four-star general and Army Chief of Staff, reverted to two stars after his CoS tour ended but chose to stay on active duty in the United States Army.

The practice of using Lieutenant General and General as a temporary rank continues to the current day, although the term "temporary" is in name only since most three- and four-star generals are expected to retain their rank regardless of their assignment. Such officers are also almost always granted permanent retirement rank, as well, in the last grade they held.

There have been no officers appointed to the rank of General of the Army since Omar Bradley and, in the 21st century U.S. military, further appointments are highly unlikely unless the United States were to become involved in a major war on the scale of World War II.

In the 1990s, the Defense Department gave some indication that the Chairman of the Joint Chiefs of Staff would possibly one day be a position worthy of the rank General of the Army, Fleet Admiral, or General of the Air Force as appropriate. This would be problematic in that with the appointment of United States Marine Corps generals as chairman, there is no current five-star USMC rank. Congressional sources indicated that there were no plans to promote any modern-day general officers to the rank of General of the Army.

The rank of General of the Army is still maintained as a rank of the U.S. military, and could again be bestowed pending approval of the United States Congress. The rank would carry a special pay grade just as the current ranks of officers do. Currently, U.S. military policy is that General of the Army, General of the Air Force, and Fleet Admiral are rankings only to be used in time of war when the commanding officer must be equal to or of higher rank than those commanding armies from another nation.

== George Washington ==
After World War II, which saw the introduction of U.S. "five-star" officers who outranked Washington, both Congress and the President revisited the issue of Washington's rank. To maintain George Washington's proper position as the first Commanding General of the United States Army, he was appointed, posthumously, to the grade of General of the Armies of the United States by congressional joint resolution Public Law 94-479 19 January 1976, approved by President Gerald R. Ford on 11 October 1976. The Department of the Army Order 31-3, issued on 13 March 1978, by Secretary of the Army Clifford Alexander, Jr., had an effective appointment date of 4 July 1976. The rank ensures that no United States Army officer outranks George Washington.

== See also ==
- List of active duty United States four-star officers
- List of United States Army four-star generals
- List of United States Navy four-star admirals
- List of United States Marine Corps four-star generals
- List of United States Air Force four-star generals
- List of United States Space Force four-star generals
- List of United States Coast Guard four-star admirals
- List of United States Public Health Service Commissioned Corps four-star admirals
- List of United States military leaders by rank
- List of General Officers of the United States Army Medical Department in World War II
- United States Army officer rank insignia
- United States Marine Corps officer rank insignia
- United States Air Force officer rank insignia
- Joint Force Air Component Commander
- Joint Force Land Component Commander
- Joint Force Maritime Component Commander
- Flag officer
- General's enlisted aide
