= The Pepsi-Cola Playhouse =

- Genre: Dramatic anthology series
- Presented by: Arlene Dahl (1953); Anita Colby (1954); Polly Bergen (1955)
- Country of origin: United States
- Original language: English
- No. of seasons: 2
- No. of episodes: 80

Production
- Running time: 24–25 minutes
- Production company: Revue Productions

Original release
- Network: ABC
- Release: October 2, 1953 – June 26, 1955

The Pepsi-Cola Playhouse is an American dramatic anthology series that aired on ABC from 1953 to 1955, sponsored by Pepsi-Cola. The show was hosted by Arlene Dahl (1953), Anita Colby (1954), and, finally, Polly Bergen (1955). Initially the series was done live, but switched to film during the first season.

== Guest stars ==
- Claude Akins
- Frances Bavier
- Whit Bissell
- Charles Bronson
- Sally Brophy
- Jean Byron
- Pat Carroll
- Bobby Clark
- Andy Clyde
- Lloyd Corrigan
- Walter Coy
- Ross Elliott
- Beverly Garland
- Nancy Gates
- Peter Graves
- Rick Jason
- Carolyn Jones
- Brian Keith
- Jack Kelly
- Barton MacLane
- Lee Marvin
- Vera Miles
- Dennis Morgan
- George Nader
- Jay Novello
- Patrick O'Neal
- Frances Rafferty
- Karen Sharpe
- Craig Stevens
- Onslow Stevens

== Episode status ==
The UCLA Film and Television Archive has three episodes of the series in its collection.

== Critical response ==
A review of the October 2, 1953, episode in the trade publication Billboard said that the series followed a standard Hollywood formula but "should be a commercial if not artistic triumph". The review called the episode's contents "unimaginative, stereotyped slop" but added that similar content was popular with housewives.
