= Karen X. Gaylord =

American actress (1921–2014)

Karen X. Gaylord (born Jane Goerner; August 29, 1921 – August 1, 2014) was an American actress and a Miss Minnesota state pageant winner.

== Early years ==
The daughter of W. C. and Marie Goerner, Gaylord was born Jane Goerner on August 29, 1921. She was born in Milwaukee, Wisconsin but grew up in Minneapolis and lived in Devils Lake, North Dakota, for three years. She attended West High School in Minneapolis and a junior college in North Dakota. She worked at a bank in Minneapolis and won the Miss Minnesota title in 1942.

== Career ==
One of the Miss Minnesota judges was Harry Conover, and after she won that title he hired her to work in his modeling agency in New York. Pictures of her appeared in many magazines, and she was featured on the cover of Liberty magazine. Gaylord was one of six models who worked in England for six weeks in 1946 while six models from there came to work in the United States for the same period in an exchange initiated by England's Lucie Clayton.

In Hollywood, Gaylord became a member of the Goldwyn Girls musical stock company. Films in which she appeared included Cover Girl (1944), Wonder Man (1945), The Kid from Brooklyn (1946), Night in Paradise (1946), The Secret Life of Walter Mitty (1947), A Song Is Born (1948), and The Girl From Jones Beach (1949).

== Personal life ==
On August 15, 1948, Gaylord married Don McGuire, an actor, television writer and director. By the mid-1950s, she had retired from acting to be a homemaker. They later divorced.
