= Prince George High School =

Location
- 7801 Laurel Spring Road; Prince George, Virginia 23875; 37°12′21.7″N 77°15′57.7″W

Information
- School type: Public, high school
- Founded: 1951/1976 (current facility)
- School district: Prince George County Public Schools
- Superintendent: Wayne Lyle
- Principal: Matthew McAllister
- Teaching staff: 129.07 (FTE)
- Grades: 10-12
- Enrollment: 1,785 (2021-22)
- Student to teacher ratio: 13.83
- Language: English
- Colors: Green, Gold, and White
- Athletics conference: Virginia High School League; Central Region; Central District
- Mascot: Alvin “Paddywagon” Spence
- Rival: Hopewell High School; Petersburg High School; Thomas Dale High School
- Website: https://pghs.pgs.k12.va.us/

Prince George High School is the only public high school in Prince George County, Virginia. It is a part of Prince George County Public Schools. The district's attendance boundary includes the entire county, which has on-post housing facilities of Fort Lee .

The school has 1,354 students. Prince George High School offers grades 10-12 rather than the traditional 9-12 high school.

== History ==
Construction on the current facility began in 1976 and it opened for the 1977–78 school year. It replaced an earlier facility across the road from it built in the 1950s, that it shares athletic facilities with. The old high school became Prince George Junior High School when the new high school opened in 1977, and has since been renamed N.B. Clements Junior High School. Prince George High School was the first fully air-conditioned school in Prince George County. The building was expanded to add additional classrooms in the mid 1990s.

== Fall Sports ==
Prince George High School offers cheerleading, cross country, field hockey, football, golf, boys' volleyball, and girls' volleyball in the fall. They recently added a swim team to the mix of school sprts in the 2023-2024 school year.

== Athletics ==
- Baseball
- Boys' basketball
- Boys' soccer
- Boys' tennis
- Boys' volleyball
- Cheer
- Cross country
- Field hockey
- Football
- Girls' basketball
- Girls' soccer
- Girls' tennis
- Girls' volleyball
- Golf
- Indoor track
- Outdoor track
- Softball
- Swim
- Wrestling

== Alma Mater ==
The alma mater is the patronal song of Prince George High School.

Prince George we love but thee,
Faitful and true we'll be
Friendly to all in need
of a good deed.

To Prince George we do bow,
Of Prince George we are proud
We love our colors bright
Green, Gold, and White.

Now and forever
Dim though our paths may be,
Always remembering
Our pledge to thee
Never to be so proud,
Smile through our hopes and fears
Prince George we're true to you
Down through the years.

== Administrators ==
- Mr. Matthew McAllister: Principal
- Mrs. Donna Branch-Harris: Assistant Principal
- Mr. Robert Bowman: Assistant Principal
- Mr. Aucet Wilson: Assistant Principal

== Notable alumni ==
- Johnny Oates, MLB player and manager
- Larry Brooks, NFL Player
- John M. McBroom, Major General, US Air Force, deceased
- Reggie Williams, NBA player
- Jackie Bradley Jr., MLB Player
- Rick Gates, political consultant
