= Brute Force (1947 film) =

1947 film by Jules Dassin

- Theatrical release lobby card
- Directed by: Jules Dassin
- Screenplay by: Richard Brooks
- Story by: Robert Patterson
- Produced by: Mark Hellinger
- Starring: Burt Lancaster; Hume Cronyn; Charles Bickford; Yvonne De Carlo; Ann Blyth; Ella Raines; Anita Colby; Sam Levene; Howard Duff; Art Smith; Jeff Corey
- Cinematography: William H. Daniels
- Edited by: Edward Curtiss
- Music by: Miklós Rózsa
- Production company: Mark Hellinger Productions
- Distributed by: Universal Pictures
- Release date: August 1947
- Running time: 98 minutes
- Country: United States
- Language: English
- Box office: $2.2 million (US rentals)

Brute Force (aka Zelle R 17) is a 1947 American noir crime tragedy film directed by Jules Dassin, from a screenplay by Richard Brooks with cinematography by William H. Daniels. It stars Burt Lancaster, Hume Cronyn, Charles Bickford and Yvonne De Carlo. This was among several noir films made by Dassin during the postwar period, together with Thieves' Highway, Night and the City and The Naked City.

== Plot ==
On a dark, rainy morning at Westgate Prison, prisoners cram into a small cell to watch through the window as Joe Collins returns from his term in solitary confinement. Joe is angry and talks about escape. The beleaguered warden A.J. Barnes is under pressure to improve discipline. His chief of security, Capt. Munsey, is a sadist who manipulates prisoners to inform on one another and create trouble so he can inflict punishment. The often drunk prison doctor Walters warns that the prison is a powder keg and will explode if they are not careful. He denounces Munsey's approach and complains that the public and government officials fail to understand the need for rehabilitation.

Joe's attorney visits and tells Joe his wife Ruth is not willing to have an operation for cancer unless Joe can be there with her. He takes his revenge on fellow inmate Wilson, who at Munsey's instigation had planted a weapon on Joe that earned him a stay in solitary. Joe has organized a fatal attack on Wilson in the prison machine shop but provides himself with an alibi by talking with the doctor in his office while the murder occurs.

Joe presses another inmate, Gallagher, to help him escape but Gallagher has a good job at the prison newspaper and Munsey has promised him parole soon. Munsey then instigates prisoner Tom Lister's suicide, giving higher authorities the opportunity to revoke all prisoner privileges and cancel parole hearings. Gallagher feels betrayed and decides to join Joe's escape plan. Joe and Gallagher plan an assault on the guard tower where they can get access to the lever that lowers a bridge that controls access to the prison.

While the escape plan is taking shape, each of the inmates in cell R17 tells their story, and in every case, their love for a woman is what landed them in trouble with the law. Munsey learns the details of the escape plan from an informer, "Freshman" Stack, one of the men in cell R17, and the break goes badly. The normally subdued prison yard turns into a violent and bloody riot, killing Munsey, Gallagher, and the remainder of the inmates in cell R17, including Joe. Dr. Walters breaks the fourth wall by commenting on the pain, futility and impossibility of escaping the system that imprisons all of them.

== Cast ==
- Burt Lancaster as Joe Collins
- Hume Cronyn as Capt. Munsey
- Charles Bickford as Gallagher
- Yvonne De Carlo as Gina Ferrara
- Ann Blyth as Ruth Collins
- Ella Raines as Cora Lister
- Anita Colby as Flossie
- Sam Levene as Louie Miller
- Jeff Corey as "Freshman" Stack
- John Hoyt as Spencer
- Jack Overman as Kid Coy
- Roman Bohnen as Warden A.J. Barnes
- Sir Lancelot as Calypso
- Vince Barnett as Muggsy
- Jay C. Flippen as Hodges
- Richard Gaines as McCollum
- Frank Puglia as Ferrara
- James Bell as Crenshaw
- Howard Duff as Robert "Soldier" Becker
- Art Smith as Dr. Walters
- Whit Bissell as Tom Lister
- James O'Rear as Wilson
- Howland Chamberlain as Lawyer

== Production ==
The direct inspiration for the unremitting desperate violence was the recent Battle of Alcatraz (May 2–4, 1946) in which prisoners fought a hopeless two-day battle rather than surrender in the aftermath of a failed escape attempt.

The film has a number of brutal scenes including the crushing of stool pigeon prisoner Wilson (James O'Rear) under a stamping machine and the beating of prisoner Louie Miller (Sam Levene) bound to a chair by handcuffs to the accompaniment of Richard Wagner's Tannhäuser overture. Film writer Eddie Muller wrote that "the climax of Brute Force displayed the most harrowing violence ever seen in movie theaters."

== Reception ==
=== Upon release ===
The staff at Variety magazine gave the film a positive review, writing, "A closeup on prison life and prison methods, Brute Force is a showmanly mixture of gangster melodramatics, sociological exposition, and sex...The s.a. elements are plausible and realistic, well within the bounds, but always pointing up the femme fatale. Thus Yvonne De Carlo, Ann Blyth, Ella Raines and Anita Colby are the women on the 'outside' whose machinations, wiles or charms accounted for their men being on the 'inside'...Bristling, biting dialog by Richard Brooks paints broad cameos as each character takes shape under existing prison life. Bickford is the wise and patient prison paper editor whose trusty (Levene), has greater freedom in getting 'stories' for the sheet. Cronyn is diligently hateful as the arrogant, brutal captain, with his system of stoolpigeons and bludgeoning methods."

Film critic Bosley Crowther wrote, "Not having intimate knowledge of prisons or prisoners, we wouldn't know whether the average American convict is so cruelly victimized as are the principal prison inmates in Brute Force, which came to Loew's Criterion yesterday. But to judge by this 'big house' melodrama, the poor chaps who languish in our jails are miserably and viciously mistreated and their jailers are either weaklings or brutes...Brute Force is faithful to its title—even to taking law and order into its own hands. The moral is: don't go to prison; you meet such vile authorities there. And, as the doctor observes sadly, 'Nobody ever escapes.'"

=== In 2004 ===
Critic Dennis Schwartz wrote, "Jules Dassin (Rififi and Naked City) directs this hard-hitting but outdated crime drama concerned about prison conditions... The point hammered home is that the prison system reflects the values of society, as Dassin castigates society for creating and then turning a blind eye toward the brutality and insensitivity of a prison system that offers no chance for rehabilitation."

In 2021 Eddie Muller called it "the bleakest of film noirs. By the time it ends, all its political posturing has been burned beyond recognition by its searing nihilism."
