= Cover Girl (film) =

1944 film by Charles Vidor

- Theatrical release poster
- Directed by: Charles Vidor
- Screenplay by: Virginia Van Upp
- Adaptation by: Marion Parsonnet; Paul Gangelin
- Story by: Erwin Gelsey
- Produced by: Arthur Schwartz
- Starring: Rita Hayworth; Gene Kelly; Lee Bowman; Phil Silvers
- Cinematography: Rudolph Maté; Allen M. Davey
- Edited by: Viola Lawrence
- Music by: Jerome Kern
- Production company: Columbia Pictures
- Distributed by: Columbia Pictures
- Release dates: March 20, 1944 (Providence, Rhode Island); April 6, 1944 (United States)
- Running time: 107 minutes
- Country: United States
- Language: English

Cover Girl is a 1944 American musical romantic comedy film directed by Charles Vidor, starring Rita Hayworth and Gene Kelly. The film tells the story of a chorus girl given a chance at stardom when she is offered an opportunity to be a highly paid cover girl. It was one of the most popular musicals of the war years.

Primarily a showcase for Hayworth, the film has lavish modern and 1890s costumes, eight dance routines for Hayworth, and songs by Jerome Kern and Ira Gershwin, including "Long Ago (and Far Away)".

== Plot ==
Rusty is a very beautiful chorus girl at a Brooklyn, New York nightclub run by her boyfriend Danny McGuire. Fellow showgirl Maurine Martin enters a contest to be on the cover of Vanity magazine, so Rusty tries out as well. When Maurine is given a lukewarm evaluation by Cornelia Jackson, she sabotages Rusty's chances, giving her terrible advice on how to act toward Cornelia. Cornelia's boss, magazine editor John Coudair, decides to check out Maurine at Danny's nightclub, but his eye is immediately drawn to Rusty. It turns out that forty years earlier, he had become instantly smitten with showgirl Maribelle Hicks, whom Rusty looks exactly like. He later discovers that Maribelle is Rusty's recently deceased grandmother.

Danny is worried that with her newfound fame, Rusty will leave him. She is quite willing to stay if only Danny would ask her. John brings along impresario Noel Wheaton to see Rusty perform; Noel is impressed by both her marvelous beauty and talent. Back-stage, he offers her a job. Danny does not want to stand in her way, so he picks an argument to send her packing. Rusty becomes a famous star on Broadway after appearing in a musical produced by Wheaton, and emotionally decides to marry him. At the last second however, she leaves the wedding and reunites with Danny, her true love.

== Cast ==
Kelly and Hayworth in Cover Girl

- Rita Hayworth as Rusty Parker / Maribelle Hicks (singing voice dubbed by Martha Mears)
- Gene Kelly as Danny McGuire
- Lee Bowman as Noel Wheaton
- Phil Silvers as Genius
- Jinx Falkenburg as Jinx Falkenburg
- Leslie Brooks as Maurine Martin
- Eve Arden as Cornelia Jackson
- Otto Kruger as John Coudair
- Jess Barker as John Coudair as a young man
- Anita Colby as Miss Colby
- Curt Bois as chef at Danny McGuire's
- Jean Colleran as cover girl: American Magazine
- Francine Counihan as cover girl: American Home
- Helen Mueller as cover girl: Collier's magazine
- Cecilia Meagher as cover girl: Coronet
- Betty Jane Hess as cover girl: Cosmopolitan magazine
- Dusty Anderson as cover girl: Farm Journal magazine
- Eileen McClory as cover girl: Glamour magazine
- Cornelia B. von Hessert as cover girl: Harper's Bazaar magazine
- Karen X. Gaylord as cover girl: Liberty magazine
- Cheryl Archibald as cover girl: Look
- Peggy Lloyd as cover girl: Mademoiselle magazine
- Betty Jane Graham as cover girl: McCall's
- Martha Outlaw as cover girl: Red Book
- Susann Shaw as cover girl: Vogue magazine
- Rose May Robson as cover girl: Woman's Home Companion
- Edward Brophy as Joe, oyster cook (uncredited)
- Thurston Hall as Tony Pastor (uncredited)
- Robert Homans as Pop, doorman (uncredited)

Notes

- The film features cameo appearances by Jinx Falkenburg and Anita Colby as themselves.
- In one of Hollywood's most unusual reprised roles, Kelly played Danny McGuire again in the 1980 film Xanadu, which was based on the 1947 movie Down to Earth starring Rita Hayworth.

== Musical numbers ==
Cover Girl marked the first film collaboration of Jerome Kern and Ira Gershwin.

- "The Show Must Go On" (Kern - music, Gershwin - lyrics)
- "Who's Complaining?" (Kern, Gershwin)
- "Sure Thing" (Kern, Gershwin)
- "Make Way For Tomorrow" (Kern, Gershwin, E.Y. Harburg - lyrics)
- "Put Me to the Test" (Kern, Gershwin)
- "Long Ago (and Far Away)" (Kern, Gershwin)
- "Poor John" (Henry E. Pether - music, Fred W. Leigh - lyrics)
- "Alter-Ego Dance" (Kern)
- "Cover Girl (That Girl on the Cover)" (Kern, Gershwin)

== Production ==
Columbia Pictures originally wanted to use Warner Bros. star Dennis Morgan for Cover Girl, but when Kelly's project at MGM, Dragon Seed, was postponed, MGM extended their loan of Kelly to Columbia, allowing this film to be made with him. Columbia's production head, Harry Cohn, was initially opposed to having Kelly do the film, but producer Schwartz nevertheless obtained him, promising Kelly that he would be able to choreograph, which MGM had not allowed him to do.

Columbia gave Kelly almost complete control over the making of this film, and many of his ideas contributed to its lasting success. He removed several of the soundstage walls so that he, Hayworth, and Silvers could dance along an entire street in one take. He also used trick photography so that he could dance with his own reflection in the sequence "Alter-Ego Dance", achieved using superimposition to give his "double" a ghost-like quality. Kelly, along with Stanley Donen, devised the choreography. Film historians consider Cover Girl the point where Kelly hit his stride in a musical role that foreshadowed the best of his future work.

The film was Hayworth's fourth musical: the first two she had done opposite Fred Astaire. Hayworth's singing voice was dubbed by Martha Mears.

Cover Girl was Columbia's first Technicolor musical, and songwriter Arthur Schwartz's first venture into producing. The film was a big hit, and made stars out of both Hayworth and Kelly. The success of Cover Girl caused MGM to pay closer attention to Kelly as a viable property, and they allowed him to create his own dance numbers for his next film, Anchors Aweigh (1945), co-starring Frank Sinatra. Columbia bought the film rights to Pal Joey, which Kelly had done on Broadway, hoping to pair up Kelly and Hayworth again, but MGM refused to loan him out, and instead the film was made with Sinatra playing the lead.

== Awards and honors ==
Carmen Dragon and Morris Stoloff won the 1944 Academy Award for Best Music, Scoring of a Musical Picture.

The following were nominated, but did not win:

- Lionel Banks, Cary Odell and Fay Babcock for Best Art Direction
- Rudolph Maté and Allen M. Davey for Best Cinematography
- Jerome Kern (music) and Ira Gershwin (lyrics) for Best Original Song for "Long Ago (and Far Away)"
- John P. Livadary for Best Sound, Recording.

The song "Long Ago (and Far Away)" was also ranked 92nd on the American Film Institute's 2004 list AFI's 100 Years...100 Songs.
