= Albert W. Kenner =

US Army Medical Corps major general (1889–1959)

Albert Walton Kenner
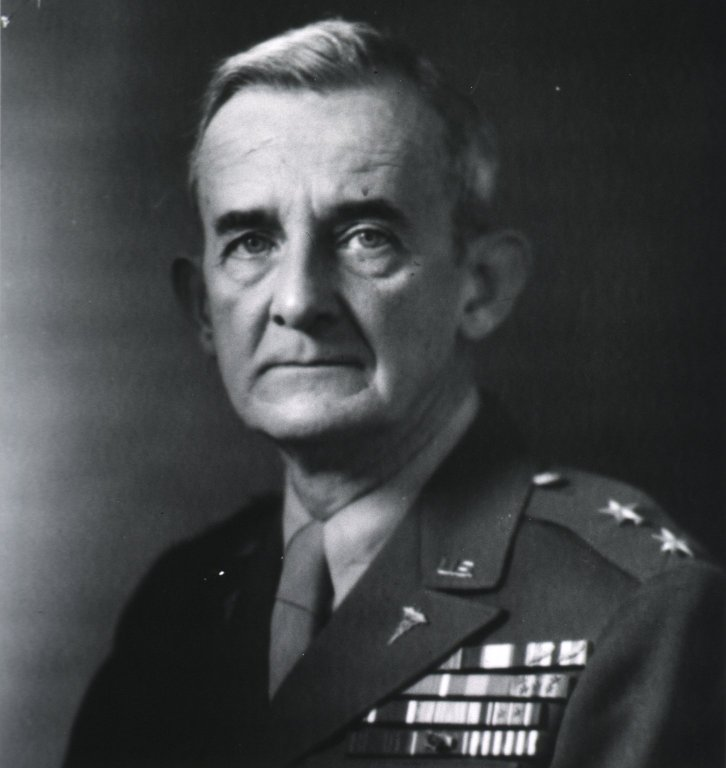
- Born: December 15, 1889; Holyoke, Massachusetts
- Died: November 12, 1959 (aged 69); Washington, D.C.
- Military career
- Allegiance: United States of America
- Branch: United States Army
- Service years: 1916–1949
- Rank: Major General
- Conflicts: Pancho Villa Expedition; World War I: Battle of Soissons (1918); Battle of Saint-Mihiel; Meuse-Argonne Offensive; World War II: Operation Torch; Operation Overlord
- Awards: Distinguished Service Cross; Distinguished Service Medal (2); Silver Star (3); Legion of Merit; Purple Heart

Albert Walton Kenner (December 15, 1889 – November 12, 1959) was a decorated United States Army Medical Corps major general who served in World War I and World War II. During World War II, he was a Chief medical officer for Operation Torch and Operation Overlord.

== Early life and World War I ==
Albert Walton Kenner was born on December 15, 1889, in Holyoke, Massachusetts. In his youth, his family moved to Virginia, where he grew up. He attended an Emerson Institute and subsequently George Washington University, where he earned his M.D. in 1915. He was a member of Phi Sigma Kappa fraternity while at George Washington.

Kenner joined the Army in 1916 and served during Pancho Villa Expedition. During World War I, Kenner sailed to France with the American Expeditionary Force, where he served as a medical officer in the 26th Infantry Regiment of the 1st Infantry Division.

During the heavy fighting at Soissons in World War I, the regimental commander, Colonel Hamilton A. Smith, was mortally wounded. Kenner voluntarily went to the front lines under heavy machine-gun fire in the hope of helping him. Finding Colonel Smith was deceased, he recovered his Smith's body and returned to his own lines. For this action, Kenner was decorated for gallantry with the Distinguished Service Cross (DSC).

At the December 1941 beginning of WWII for the US, Kenner was Chief Surgeon of the Armored Force, based at Fort Knox, Kentucky. He went overseas in September 1942 to become Deputy Chief Surgeon, Allied Force Headquarters for the Operation Torch invasion of North Africa, and remained in that Theater. In early 1944 he came to England, to became the Chief Surgeon at SHAEF, and in May 1945 the Chief Surgeon, European Theater of Operations, relieving MG Paul Ramsey Hawley, who came home to direct the Medical Section of the Veterans Administration.

In addition to his DSC, he received three Silver Stars, one Purple Heart, one French Croix de guerre 1914–1918 with Palm, and one Legion of Honour, in World War I.

== Retirement ==
Major general Kenner retired on June 30, 1949, and stayed in Washington, D.C., area with his wife, Raymonde Minard Kenner (1896–1959) until his death on November 12, 1959, at the age of 69 years. On April 16, 1962, the army hospital at Fort Lee, Virginia (now Kenner Army Health Clinic) was named in his honor.

== Military awards ==
Kenner's military decorations and awards:

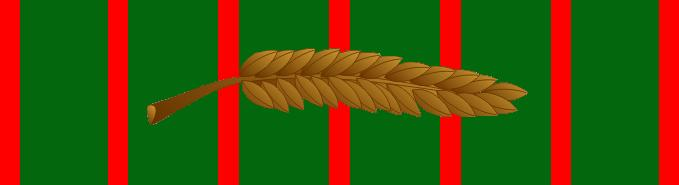

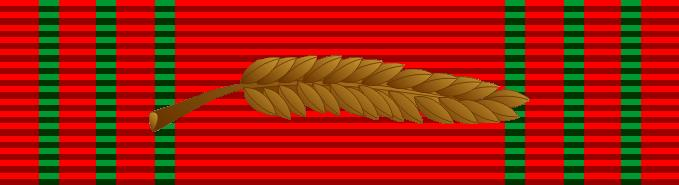

| 1st Row | Distinguished Service Cross | | Army Distinguished Service Medal w/ OLC | Silver Star w/ 2 OLCs |
| 2nd Row | Legion of Merit | Purple Heart | Mexican Border Service Medal | World War I Victory Medal w/ 5 battle clasps (4 stars) |
| 3rd Row | Army of Occupation of Germany Medal | American Defense Service Medal | American Campaign Medal | European-African-Middle Eastern Campaign Medal w/ 4 bronze stars |
| 4th Row | World War II Victory Medal | Army of Occupation Medal | Officer of the Legion of Honour | Chevalier of the Ordre des Palmes Académiques |
| 5th Row | Médaille commémorative de la guerre 1914–1918 | French Croix de guerre 1914–1918 with Palm | Knight of the Belgian Order of the Crown | Belgian Croix de guerre 1940–1945 with Palm |

=== Distinguished Service Cross citation ===
Kenner's DSC citation reads:

General Orders: War Department, General Orders No. 15 (1919)
Action Date: 22-July-1918
Name: Albert Walton Kenner
Service: Army
Rank: Major
Regiment: 26th Infantry Regiment (Attached)
Division: 1st Division, American Expeditionary Forces

Citation: The President of the United States of America, authorized by Act of Congress, July 9, 1918, takes pleasure in presenting the Distinguished Service Cross to Major (Medical Corps) Albert W. Kenner, United States Army, for extraordinary heroism in action while serving with 26th Infantry Regiment (Attached), 1st Division, A.E.F., near Soissons, France, 22 July 1918. Learning that his regimental commander had been mortally wounded, Major Kenner voluntarily went through machine-gun fire beyond the front lines in the hope of helping him. Finding his colonel dead, he recovered the body, in spite of the danger to which such action subjected him.
