= Prince George County Public Schools =

School district in Virginia, United States

Coordinates: 37°13′20.662″N 77°17′17.804″W

Address
- 6410 Courts Dr. Prince George, Virginia, 23875; United States
- Coordinates: 37°13'20.662"N, 77°17'17.804"W

District information
- Type: Public
- Motto: Lead, Innovate, Inspire
- Grades: Pre-K through 12th grade
- Established: unknown
- Superintendent: Douglas Lyle Jr.
- School board: 6 members
- Governing agency: Virginia Department of Education
- Accreditations: VDOE; USDOE
- Schools: 8+1 technical school
- Budget: $6,255,916
- NCES District ID: 5103090

Students and staff
- Students: 6,106 (2020–2021)
- Teachers: 441.75 (2020–2021)
- Student–teacher ratio: 13.82 (2020–2021)

Other information
- Website: www.pgs.k12.va.us

Prince George County Public Schools is the school district that provides schooling to the children in Prince George County, Virginia, United States. The school district also serves the military families who live on the U.S. Military base Fort Gregg-Adams.

The school division's boundary is that of the county.

== History ==
=== 2020 ===
During the 2020–2021 school year, the Prince George County School Board had a meeting where they voted to close the William A. Walton Elementary School and build a replacement school due to mold inside the school. The new school will be called Middle Road Elementary School. The school opened during the 2022–2023 school year.

==== August ====
On August 7, 2020, Prince George County Public Schools announced during the COVID-19 pandemic that they would opt into a hybrid instruction plan for the 2020–2021 school year. The county's parents and students were split on how they believed the schools should return to providing classes. In a district survey, 51% of parents preferred an all-virtual option while the remainder wanted to return in-person classes. The district then released their return to school plan that includes a hybrid education method. The plan states that half of the district can learn in school with social distancing and reduced class sizes in effect while the other half can learn virtually. The county's school district was the 3rd Tri-cities School district to opt to have in-person learning and virtual learning. In response to the survey, the School Board Chair, Chris Johnson, said that the teachers' survey responses were what stuck out to him the most when he was making his decision whether to allow in-person learning or just virtual learning. 78% of teachers in the survey wanted to return to teaching in-person rather than virtual.

On August 25, Prince George County public schools announced that they are having a school Chromebook shortage. The cause of the shortage is from the high number of students that are doing virtual learning due to the pandemic. It was also stated that a delivery of over 2,500 laptops would be delayed until December.

=== 2024 ===
==== February ====
In February 2024, a 13-year-old boy at J.E.J Moore Middle School was arrested on school grounds for making threats to attack the school and harm students. The student was charged with 2 counts of threats to kill or injure people on school grounds.

==== July ====
On July 31, former PGCPS Assistant Superintendent, William A. Barnes, Jr., 78, was charged with nine felonies, including aggravated sexual battery, indecent liberties with a minor and sexual assault by force or threat. The alleged incidents occurred more than three decades earlier in the 1980s when the retired school administrator was a junior high school guidance counselor.

==== August ====
In August, parents criticized the school district for its handling of the allegations against the former assistant superintendent.

==== September ====
In September, a state police investigation confirmed that the Prince George County School Board had learned of the decades old sex abuse allegations against the former administrator, however by the time Barnes was criminally charged he was no longer employed by the school district, having retired after a 50 year career as an educator. The former Superintendent of Schools in Prince George, Lisa Pennycuff, who had by then also retired and been appointed interim Superintendent of Schools in Hanover County, provided the Hanover School Board Chair with key dates about the timeline of the events concerning the allegations against Barnes.

==== October ====
In October, a teacher at Harrison Elementary was arrested for possession of child pornography. It was not believed that they had any inappropriate pictures of students. The teacher was put on administrative leave pending the investigation results.

In response to a nationwide shortage of bus drivers, parents blamed the district's transportation department for students having lower grades. The district's transportation department said they are short 200 bus drivers and that the issue is caused by bus drivers having to do back-to-back routes causing students to arrive late at school. Prince George County Public Schools has over 1,000 bus routes to cover.

==== December ====
There was a fundraiser to make blankets for a non-profit organization named Project ASK which is a childhood cancer foundation. The fundraiser was held to make blankets for kids with cancer in time for Christmas.

=== Fort Gregg-Adams ===
The school district includes students from a U.S. military base Fort Gregg-Adams. According to the 2020 U.S. census, the county has gained 20% more students than in 2010. The population grew to 43,010 people which makes Prince George the 5th most populated county.

== Critical Race Policy ==
Prince George County Public Schools voted to not implement the critical race policy. The district's school board said that the policy looks like it is trying to divide people of the country and the schools. Some board members spoke out against the policy stating that the color of someone's skin should not dictate any divide in their lifestyle.

== Transgender Policy ==
Before the start of the 2021-2022 PGCPS School Board voted on the policies. The bathroom policy caused a huge discussion between parents during the public comment period of the meeting and from the school board members. The board implemented a gender neutral bathroom policy as a way to welcome trans students into a comfortable facility.

== School board ==
=== Superintendent ===
Douglas Lyle Jr. who was an educator in the state of Virginia for over 30 years was appointed by the school board to become the next superintendent of Prince George County Public Schools.

=== List of superintendents ===
Name	term
James E. Rooks	1967-1993 (retired)
Dorothea M. Shannon	1998-2006
R. Francis Moore	2006-2009 (retired)
Bobby Browder	2009-2015 (resigned)
Renee Williams	2015-2019 (retired)
Lisa Pennycuff	July 1, 2019 – July 23, 2024 (retired)
Douglas Lyle Jr.	September 10, 2024–present

=== School board members ===
Name
Robert Eley III
Michelle Crist
Jill Andrews
Sherry Taylor
Christopher Johnson

== Demographics ==
=== By race ===
As of the start of the 2024–2025 school year

Race percentage of students
Race	Total percentage of students
White	47.1%
Black	29.6%
Hispanic	13.9%
Asian	1.2%
Other	8.3%

=== By gender ===
As of the start of the 2024–2025 school year

Gender percentage of students
Gender	Total percentage of students
Male	51%
Female	49%

=== Other info ===
- The student to teacher ratio is: 15:1
- Average percentage of certified teachers: 99.8%
- Average percentage of teachers with over three years of experience: 89.1%
- The total number of full time councilors that work for the district: 8

== Academic success ==
=== Averages ===
As of the end of the 2023–2024 school year

Test score average for students (overall of all grades and subjects)
Below average	Average	Above average
29%	71%	<1%

=== Graduation ranking ===
Rankings are as of the start of the 2024–2025 school year

District rankings
Ranking factors	National rank	State rank
College Readiness Index Rank	#9,889	#208
College Curriculum Breadth Index Rank	#10,124 (tie)	#226
State Assessment Proficiency Rank	#8,478	#154
State Assessment Performance Rank	#9,466	#172
Graduation Rate Rank	#11,126 (tie)	#172 (tie)

=== Test scores ===
As of the end of the 2023–2024 school year

Test score proficiency (subject)
School	Math (percentage)	English (percentage)
Elementary	73%	78%
Middle	61%	71%
High	79%	89%

== Financials ==
Overall the district spends an average of $11,127 per student per year. The district's total revenue is $72,661,000.

=== Budget ===
The 2024–2025 school year's general budget is $6,255,916 and that total is 7.13% over the given FY2024 adopted budget of $87,780,829.

=== Funding ===
As of the start of the 2024–2025 school year

Funding
From	Amount (percentage of budget)
State	60.8%
Local	26.5%
Federal	12.7%

== Partnerships ==
The school district partners with many colleges including the following:

- College of William and Mary
- Randolph-Macon College
- Richard Bland College
- Virginia Commonwealth
- Virginia State University
- Virginia Union University

== Schools ==
=== Elementary schools ===
- LL Beazley Elementary
- North Elementary
- South Elementary
- Middle Road Elementary
- Harrison Elementary

=== Middle schools ===
- J.E.J. Moore Middle School

=== High schools ===
- N.B. Clements Jr High School
- Prince George High School

==== Optional high schools ====
- Rowanty Technical Center

=== Education centers ===
- Prince George Education Center

== Former schools ==
=== Elementary schools ===
- William A. Walton Elementary School
- Burrowsville Elementary School
- Carson Elementary School
- Bessie Mason Elementary School

=== High Schools ===
- Disputanta High School
- J.E.J. Moore Junior High School

== See also ==
- Prince George County, Virginia
- Prince George High School
