= United States Army officer rank insignia =

United States Army commissioned officers rank insignia in use today.

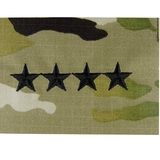
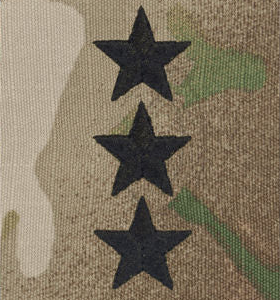
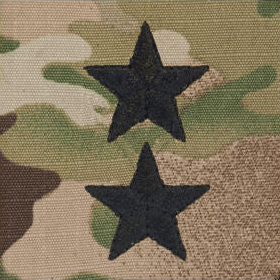
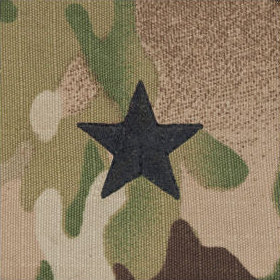
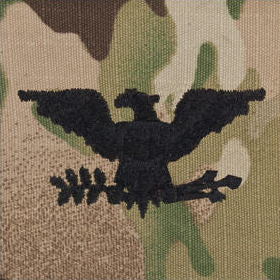
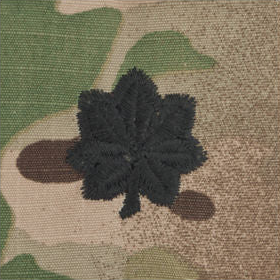
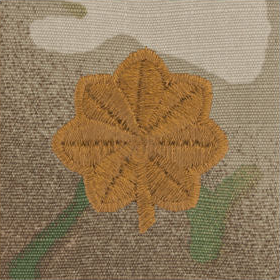
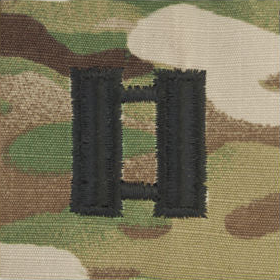
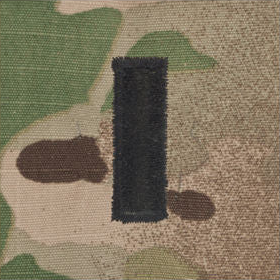
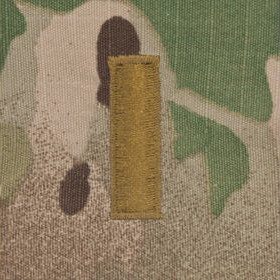
US DoW pay grade	Special grade (Note: Reserved for wartime use only.)	O-10	O-9	O-8	O-7	O-6	O-5	O-4	O-3	O-2	O-1
NATO code	OF-10	OF-9	OF-8	OF-7	OF-6	OF-5	OF-4	OF-3	OF-2	OF-1
Insignia
Army Green Service Uniform
Army Blue Service Uniform
Mess Dress Uniform
Army Combat Uniform
Title	General of the Army	General	Lieutenant general	Major general	Brigadier general	Colonel	Lieutenant colonel	Major	Captain	First lieutenant	Second lieutenant
Abbreviation	GA	GEN	LTG	MG	BG	COL	LTC	MAJ	CPT	1LT	2LT

== Structure ==
The commissioned officer ranks of the United States Army can be split into three categories, from highest to lowest: general officers, field grade officers and company grade officers. General officers encompass the ranks from brigadier general up. Field grade includes major, lieutenant colonel, and colonel. Company grade includes second lieutenant, first lieutenant, and captain.

== Silver versus gold ==
In terms of heraldic tradition, insignia changes over time created the situation of silver outranking gold. Beginning in 1780, general officer rank was designated by silver stars. Beginning in the 1830s, colonels wore silver eagles, with the color likely chosen because general officers already wore silver. Infantry officers wore silver epaulettes, while other branches wore gold, and their rank insignia was the opposite color of their epaulettes, so Infantry first lieutenants and captains wore gold bars. All second lieutenants wore epaulettes with no insignia.

During the American Civil War, all lieutenant colonels were directed to wear a silver oak leaf with gold braid on the epaulette, and all majors a gold leaf with silver braid. In 1872, the army began to use shoulder knots instead of epaulettes. Since generals, colonels, and lieutenant colonels already wore silver, changing the insignia of first lieutenants and captains from gold to silver was logical. Since majors already wore gold oak leaves, maintaining the current policy was also logical. Shoulder knots with no insignia designated second lieutenants. By World War I, metal collar insignia was regularly used to designate officers, requiring a way to differentiate between second lieutenants and privates; since silver bars already designated first lieutenants, the army opted to use gold for second lieutenants.

== General of the Army / Armies ==
While not currently in use today, special insignia were authorized by Congress for ten general officers who were promoted to the highest ranks in the United States Army: General of the Army, designed as a "five-star" rank, and General of the Armies, considered to be the equivalent of a "six-star" rank. Eight generals were promoted to the rank and title "General of the Army" (Ulysses S. Grant, William Tecumseh Sherman, Philip Sheridan, George C. Marshall, Douglas MacArthur, Dwight D. Eisenhower, Henry H. Arnold, and Omar Bradley), while three generals were promoted to the higher rank and title of "General of the Armies of the United States" (George Washington, John J. Pershing, and, as of December 2022, Ulysses S. Grant).

Congress created the rank of General of the Armies specifically for Washington, although while living he never officially accepted the honor. Pershing received the rank in 1919 and was allowed to choose his own insignia; he chose to use four stars. In 1976, Congressman Mario Biaggi of New York submitted a House resolution granting Washington the promotion. The promotion was effective on July 4, 1976, the bicentennial of the Declaration of Independence. Although Pershing accepted the rank in 1919 and technically had a date of rank that preceded Washington's, the new law specified that no other officer of the United States Army should ever outrank Washington, including Pershing. Hence, effective date of rank notwithstanding, Washington was permanently made superior to all other officers of the United States Armed Forces, past or present.

While no living officer holds either of these ranks today, the General of the Army title and five-star insignia designed in 1944 are still authorized for use in wartime. Congress may promote generals to this rank for successful wartime campaigns, or to give the officer parity in rank to foreign counterparts in joint coalitions, specifically with respect to field marshals.

== History ==
=== 1775–1780: cockades or sashes ===
The structure of United States military ranks had its roots in British military traditions, adopting the same or similar ranks and titles. At the start of the American Revolutionary War in 1775, the Continental Army's lack of standardized uniforms and insignia proved confusing for soldiers in the field. To correct the situation, George Washington, who had been appointed general and commander in chief, recommended the following stopgap solution for distinguishing the ranks:

"As the Continental Army has unfortunately no uniforms, and consequently many inconveniences must arise from not being able to distinguish the commissioned officers from the privates, it is desired that some badge of distinction be immediately provided; for instance that the field officers may have red or pink colored cockades in their hats, the captains yellow or buff, and the subalterns green."

Generals wore a sash diagonally across their shoulders between their coats and waistcoats. Brigadier generals wore a pink sash, major generals a purple sash, and George Washington, as commander in chief, wore a light blue sash. Aides-de-camp (mostly with the rank of captain) to officers of general grades wore a green sash.

Later on in the war, the Continental Army established its own uniform with a black and white cockade among all ranks. Infantry officers had silver and other branches gold insignia.

=== 1780–1821: epaulettes ===
In 1780, regulations prescribed fringed epaulettes for all officer ranks, with silver stars for general officers. Field officers wore two epaulettes, captains one epaulette on the right shoulder, subalterns one epaulette on the left shoulder. For commissioned officers metal epaulettes were introduced by a general order dated June 18, 1780 (except for those of the CiC). For non-commissioned officers cloth epaulettes were prescribed since a general order dated July 23. 1775. That order differentiated only between the ranks of serjeant and corporal. At the end of war, the serjeant-major was recognizable by a pair of cloth epaulettes. The number, position and color of the NCO-epaulettes were changed several times.

=== 1821–1832: chevrons or epaulettes ===
From 1821 to 1832, the Army used chevrons to identify company officer grades, a practice that is still observed at West Point for cadet officers. Officers serving as regimental adjutants were indicated by a single point up gold (infantry: silver) lace chevron and arc on both upper sleeves, captains the same but no arcs, lieutenants wore the chevrons on the lower sleeves. All company officers wore dark blue "wings" with gold (infantry: silver) fringes and Embroidery.

General staff, artillery, engineer and field officers wore bullion-fringed epaulets: Generals with one or two five-pointed stars, depending on rank. Colonels, lieutenant colonels and majors plain gold (infantry: silver) epaulets. Captains a single epaulet on the right shoulder, lieutenants on the left shoulder.

On May 23, 1829, the army added an undress frock coat for officers. Rank was shown by gold (for all branches) eagles worn on the collar. Colonels and majors wore one on each side, captains one on the right and lieutenants one on the left. Generals are not mentioned.

The eagles were replaced on July 22, 1829, by shoulder straps consisting of a strip of lace, again worn on both sides for colonels and majors, the right side for captains and the left side for lieutenants. The lace was probably in gold, with silver for infantry officers.

=== 1832–1851: epaulettes and slash flaps vs. shoulder straps (1836) ===
In 1832, epaulettes were specified for all officers. The epaulettes worn by the infantry continued to be silver, while all other branches continued to wear gold epaulettes. Generals continued to wear silver stars. In order that their rank insignia would be clearly discernible, infantry colonels had an eagle of gold on the epaulet strap because it was placed on a silver epaulet and all other colonels had silver eagles on gold epaulettes. The bullion of fringe on the epaulettes of colonels was three and a half inches long and one half inch wide. Lieutenant colonels wore the same epaulettes without the eagle. Majors wore the same with the lace making up the strap of the epaulette in the opposite color (gold for infantry and silver for others). Captains wore plain silver or gold epaulettes with fringe two and half inches long and a quarter inch wide and for lieutenants the fringe was an eighth inch wide. In addition, there was on the cuffs a slash flap with several horizontal rows of lace with a button on the outer ends. The lace was of yellow colour (infantry, white). Field officers wore four flaps and buttons, captains wore three, lieutenants wore two.

Through regulations published in 1834 there was no prescribed insignia for the undress frock coats. However, uniform regulations published in the Army and Navy Chronicle on November 26, 1835 show shoulder straps were to be worn.

The straps for generals were a rectangle of quarter-inch-wide gold embroidery with a dark blue center. The appropriate number of stars were worn in silver centered in the rectangle. For other officers the border was only an eighth of an inch wide in silver for infantry and gold for others. Full Colonels wore an eagle in the center of the strap in gold for infantry and silver for others. Lieutenant colonels wore an oak leaf at each end of the strap in the same color as the border. Majors wore oak leaves in the opposite color. Captains wore two bars at each end in the same color as the border and First Lieutenants one bar. Second Lieutenants wore an empty rectangle.

=== 1851–1872: epaulettes vs. shoulder straps ===
In 1851, it was decided to use only silver eagles for colonels, as a matter of economy. The silver eagle was selected based on the fact that there were more colonels with the silver eagle than those with gold, primarily in the cavalry and artillery, hence it was cheaper to replace the numerically fewer gold ones in the infantry. The concept of silver for infantry and gold for other officers was abolished. At that time on the shoulder straps, lieutenant colonels wore an embroidered silver leaf; majors wore a gold embroidered leaf; and captains and first lieutenants wore gold bars. The second lieutenant had no grade insignia, but the presence of an epaulet or shoulder strap identified him as a commissioned officer. Badges were added to the epaulets. Lieutenant colonels added an oak leaf of silver, captains two bars of gold, and first lieutenants one bar of gold. The bars on the epaulets were silver for contrast. For majors, the shoulder strap contained an oak leaf, but like the second lieutenant, the epaulet had no grade insignia. Majors were still distinguishable from the second lieutenants by the more elaborate epaulet fringes worn by field grade officers. During the American Civil War, General William Rosecrans issued orders in fall of 1862 which allowed commissioned officers to wear only the bars, oak leaves, or eagle to show their rank, in order to draw less attention from enemy forces on the battlefield. These orders allowed for what became the predecessor of what is now referred to as "subdued" rank insignia while in the field, though it is unlikely that this term was used at the time. In the fall of 1864, General Order 286 allowed all officers in the United States Army to wear less visible rank insignia stating, "The marks of rank prescribed to be worn on the shoulder-straps will be worn on the shoulder in place of the strap."

=== 1872–1917: shoulder straps ===
In 1872, epaulettes were abolished for officers (except the general staff) and replaced by shoulder knots. As the shoulder knots had no fringe, it was necessary that some change in the insignia on the dress uniform be made in order to distinguish the major from the second lieutenant. It was natural to use the gold leaf which the major had been wearing on the shoulder strap. In the same year, the bars on the shoulder straps of the captains and first lieutenants were changed from gold to silver.

In 1898 a khaki coat was added to wear in the field. Rank was shown on the end of the shoulder loops. This method was used on olive drab field uniforms introduced in 1902.

=== 1917–2014: shoulder loops ===
By 1917 and the time of World War I, the olive drab service uniform had gradually become used more frequently and the blue uniform was worn only on formal dress occasions. As a result, metal insignia was authorized for wear on the service uniform on the shoulder loop and on the collar of the shirt when worn without a jacket. Shortly after the United States entered the war, only the service olive drab uniform was being worn. The need for an insignia for the second lieutenant became urgent. Among the proposals was one to authorize for that grade a single bar, the first lieutenant two bars, and the captain three bars. However, the policy of making as little change as possible prevailed, and a gold bar was adopted in 1917, following the precedent previously established by the adoption of the major's insignia.

In 1944, officers and enlisted personnel in leadership positions started wearing leader identification badges - narrow green bands under their rank insignia; this was initially approved as a temporary measure for European Theater of Operations, but was approved for select branches in 1945 then for the entire Army in 1948.

=== Timeline ===
Rank group	General / flag officers						Senior officers			Junior officers
1775–1780
1775–1780	General and Commander in chief			Major general	Brigadier general	Aide-de-camp	Colonel	Lieutenant colonel	Major	Captain	Lieutenant	Ensign
1780–1821
1780–1821	Commander-in-chief			Major general	Brigadier general		Colonel	Lieutenant colonel	Major	Captain (Note: No insignia on the left shoulder.)	Subaltern (Note: No insignia on the right shoulder.)
1832–1851
1832–1851			Major general Commanding the Army	Major general	Brigadier general		Colonel	Lieutenant colonel	Major	Captain	Lieutenant
1861–1864
1861–1864			Major general Commanding the Army	Major general	Brigadier general		Colonel	Lieutenant colonel	Major	Captain	First lieutenant	Second lieutenant
1864–1866
1864–1866			Lieutenant general	Major general	Brigadier general		Colonel	Lieutenant colonel	Major	Captain	First lieutenant	Second lieutenant
1866–1872
1866–1872		General of the Army of the United States	Lieutenant general	Major general	Brigadier general		Colonel	Lieutenant colonel	Major	Captain	First lieutenant	Second lieutenant
1872–1888
1872–1888		General of the Army of the United States	Lieutenant general	Major general	Brigadier general		Colonel	Lieutenant colonel	Major	Captain	First lieutenant	Second lieutenant
1888
1888		General of the Army of the United States		Major general	Brigadier general		Colonel	Lieutenant colonel	Major	Captain	First lieutenant	Second lieutenant
1902–1917
1944–1959
1959–2015
2015–2020
	General of the Army	General	Lieutenant general	Major general	Brigadier general		Colonel	Lieutenant colonel	Major	Captain	First lieutenant	Second lieutenant
Uniformed services pay grade	Special grade	O-10	O-9	O-8	O-7		O-6	O-5	O-4	O-3	O-2	O-1

== See also ==
- United States Army enlisted rank insignia
- United States Military Academy#Rank and organization
- Comparative army officer ranks of the Americas
