= Anita Colby =

American model, actress, and business consultant (1914–1992)

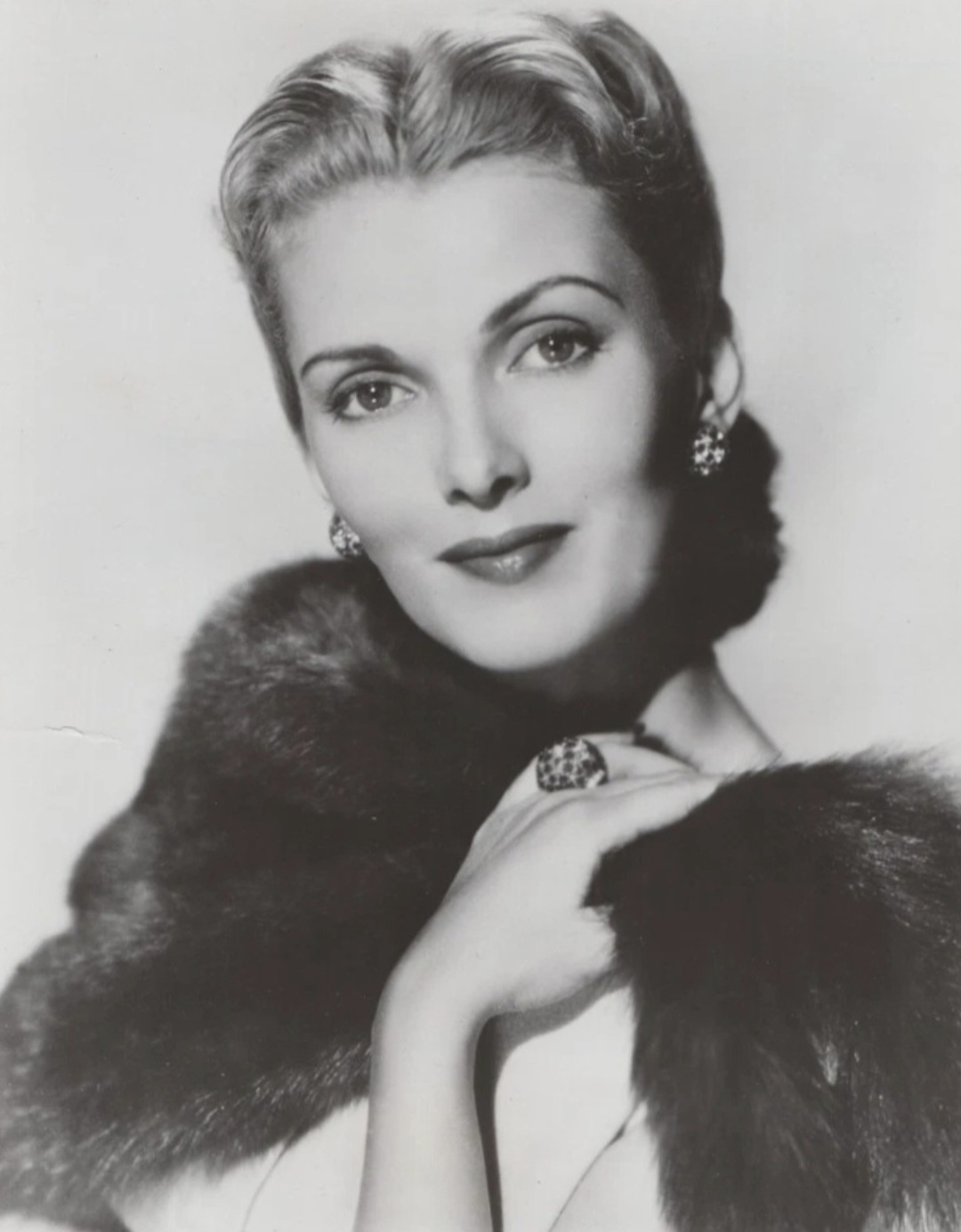
- Colby in 1954
- Born: Anita Counihan; August 5, 1914; Washington, D.C., U.S.
- Died: March 27, 1992 (aged 77); Oyster Bay, Long Island, New York, U.S.
- Occupations: Model, actress, fashion beauty consultant and writer
- Years active: 1936–1963
- Spouse: Palen Flagler (m. 1970; died 1984)

Anita Colby (born Anita Counihan; August 5, 1914– March 27, 1992) was an American model, actress, and business consultant.

== Early years ==
Colby was born Anita Counihan, the daughter of Margaret Anne McCarthy and the cartoonist Daniel Francis "Bud" Counihan, a legendary figure among New York City artists and newsmen, in Washington, D.C. Her younger sister, Francine Counihan (later Francine Okie), was also a model. She was English-Spanish on her mother's side and Irish-American on her father's side.

== Career ==
Colby moved to New York when she was 19, and she became a model for John Powers's agency. Early in Colby's career, at $50 an hour, she was the highest paid model at the time. She was nicknamed "The Face" and appeared on numerous billboards and ads, many of them for cigarette advertisers. She later became the first model to be paid $100 per hour.

She moved to Hollywood from New York in 1935 and changed her name to Colby. She had a bit part in Mary of Scotland (1936) and other B movies, but her acting career never took off. After two years, she returned to New York and became an ad salesperson for Harper's Bazaar. She made her name in Hollywood almost 10 years after leaving films when she worked on a nationwide advertising campaign for the film Cover Girl (1944), in which she also appeared with her sister Francine Counihan. She began acting in films again in the 1940s, including Brute Force (1947).

Colby was hired by David O. Selznick in the 1940s to teach contract actresses, such as Jennifer Jones, about beauty, poise, and publicity. Her job title at his production company, Selznick International Pictures, was "Feminine Director". She worked closely with Selznick's top actresses, such as Jennifer Jones, Ingrid Bergman, Shirley Temple, Dorothy McGuire, and Joan Fontaine. She wrote Anita Colby's Beauty Book in 1952. Colby later hosted the television program The Pepsi-Cola Playhouse in 1954. The same year, she received a patent for a chair convertible into an inclined bed (U.S. patent 2,690,209, filed in 1952). She was a devout Roman Catholic.

== Personal life and death ==
Colby married business executive Palen Flagler in 1970; he died in 1980. She died of lung disease at her home in Oyster Bay, Long Island, on March 27, 1992, aged 77.

== Filmography ==
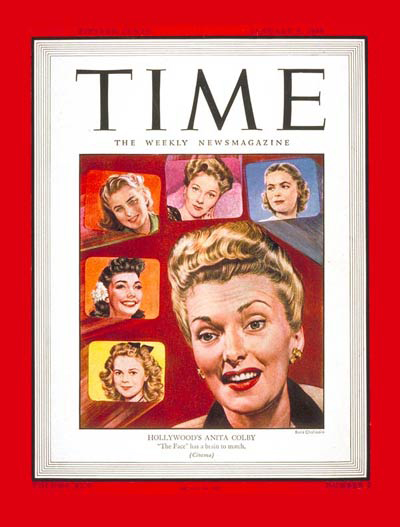
"The Face" on the cover of Time (January 8, 1945), when she was feminine director of Selznick International Pictures

- The Christophers (1 episode, 1963)
- The Pepsi-Cola Playhouse (1954) as Host
- Brute Force (1947) as Flossie
- Cover Girl (1944) as Miss Colby
- China Passage (1937, uncredited) as the Nurse
- Walking on Air (1936) as Ex-Mrs. Fred Randolph
- Mary of Scotland (1936) as Mary Fleming
- The Bride Walks Out (1936, uncredited) as Saleslady
