= Kenner Army Health Clinic =

Medical care facility at Fort Lee, Virginia

Coordinates: 37°14′18″N 77°20′48″W

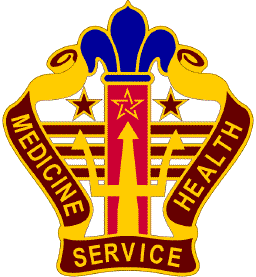
- Kenner Army Health Clinic
- Active: April 16, 1962 – Present
- Country: United States
- Allegiance: United States of America
- Branch: United States Army
- Type: Clinic
- Role: Outpatient Services
- Garrison/HQ: Fort Lee, Virginia

Commanders
- Current commander: Lieutenant Colonel Joanna A. Bailey

Kenner Army Health Clinic – formerly Kenner Army Community Hospital – is the primary health care facility for Fort Lee, Virginia.

== History ==
Kenner first opened as a hospital on March 30, 1941, with 871 beds, and was expanded to 2,000 beds by October 1942. On June 7, 1944, it was designated a regional hospital and remained in that status until it was downsized to 1,100 beds in 1947.

When Camp Lee was renamed in 1950 and designated Fort Lee, the hospital became US Army Hospital, Fort Lee, and was downsized to 200 beds. It continued to operate in the World War II wooden buildings until a new hospital opened on April 16, 1962. The Kenner Army Hospital was named for Major General Albert W. Kenner and had a capacity of 100 beds, expandable to 200. A new outpatient wing was added in 1976, followed by a full renovation in 1977.

In 1985, the hospital received two Army Superior Unit citations for its use of Medical Unit Self-Contained Transportable (MUST) hospital operating room equipment during a renovation of the facility's operating rooms. The facility received its second citation in 1990–91 in recognition of support rendered during the deployment and subsequent demobilization of troops that participated in Desert Shield/Desert Storm.

In July 1995, the hospital was set for downsizing by the Base Realignment and Closure (BRAC) commission, and had its inpatient and emergency department services closed in 1996. As a result, the hospital was officially redesignated Kenner Army Health Clinic on October 1, 1996.

Kenner provides a full range of outpatient services to its more than 30,000 beneficiaries, including adult and pediatric primary care and limited specialty care services.
