= Fort Lee (military base) =

US Army fort in Virginia, US

- Prince George County, Virginia, U.S.

Site information
- Type: U.S. Army post
- Controlled by: United States Army

Location
- Location in Virginia Fort Lee (the United States)
- Coordinates: 37°14′06″N 77°19′58″W

Site history
- Built: 1917
- In use: 1917–1924; 1941–present

Garrison information
- Garrison: Combined Arms Support Command (CASCOM)/Sustainment Center of Excellence (SCoE); U.S. Army Quartermaster School; U.S. Army Ordnance School; U.S. Army Transportation School; Army Sustainment University (ALU); Defense Commissary Agency (DeCA)

Fort Lee is a United States Army post mostly in unincorporated Prince George County, Virginia, and headquarters of the United States Army Combined Arms Support Command (CASCOM)/ Sustainment Center of Excellence (SCoE), the U.S. Army Quartermaster School, the U.S. Army Ordnance School, the U.S. Army Transportation School, the Army Sustainment University (ALU), Defense Contract Management Agency (DCMA), and the U.S. Defense Commissary Agency (DeCA).

Fort Lee also hosts two Army museums (the U.S. Army Quartermaster Museum and the U.S. Army Women's Museum), a Military Entrance Processing Command station, and the vocational training schools for culinary specialists in the U.S. Army and U.S. Navy. The equipment and other materiel associated with the Army's Ordnance Museum was moved to the post in 2009 and 2010 for use by the United States Army Ordnance Training and Heritage Center.

For statistical purposes, the United States Census Bureau has defined Fort Lee as a census-designated place (CDP) with a population of 9,874 as of the 2020 census – nearly triple the size of the 2010 census count.

== Naming ==
The installation was initially named Camp Lee after Robert E. Lee, a Confederate general; the name was changed to Fort Lee in 1950. When the camp was originally named in 1917, the U.S. Army had an informal policy of naming new sites after popular local figures, and it prioritized using the names of "Confederates for camps of divisions from southern States".

Fort Lee was one of the U.S. Army installations named for Confederate soldiers that the U.S. Naming Commission recommended be renamed. On 8 August 2022, the commission proposed that the name be changed to Fort Gregg-Adams, after Lieutenant General Arthur J. Gregg and Lieutenant Colonel Charity Adams Earley. On 6 October 2022, Secretary of Defense Lloyd Austin accepted the recommendation and directed the name change occur no later than 1 January 2024. On 5 January 2023, William A. LaPlante, US under-secretary of defense for acquisition and sustainment, directed the full implementation of the recommendations.

On 27 April 2023, the post was officially renamed to Fort Gregg-Adams. It was the first U.S. military base to be named for African Americans. The naming of Fort Gregg-Adams was notable as it was the first time since 1900 that a fort had been named after a service member (Gregg) who was still alive at the time.

In June 2025, the name was again changed to Ft. Lee, but this time to honor Buffalo Soldier Private Fitz Lee, a Spanish–American War veteran who, under enemy fire, rescued wounded soldiers in Cuba, earning him the Medal of Honor. Private Lee, a historically obscure service member, was chosen due to sharing a surname with the former Confederate general. The Pentagon was forbidden by law from reverting the name back to that of its former namesake, and chose Private Lee from a list of recipients of military decorations as a workaround.

When US President Donald Trump spoke about the renaming at Fort Bragg on June 10, 2025, he announced that the Army would be "restoring the names to Fort Pickett, Fort Hood, Fort Gordon, Fort Rucker, Fort Polk, Fort A.P. Hill and Fort Robert E. Lee", erroneously mentioning the name of the former Confederate general instead of the US Army private.

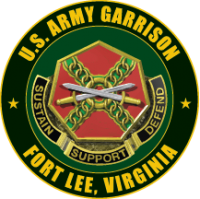
Prior to April 2023

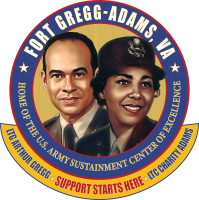
c. April 2023 – June 2025

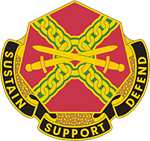
Post June 2025

Evolution of the installation logo responsive to name changes.

== History ==
=== World War I ===
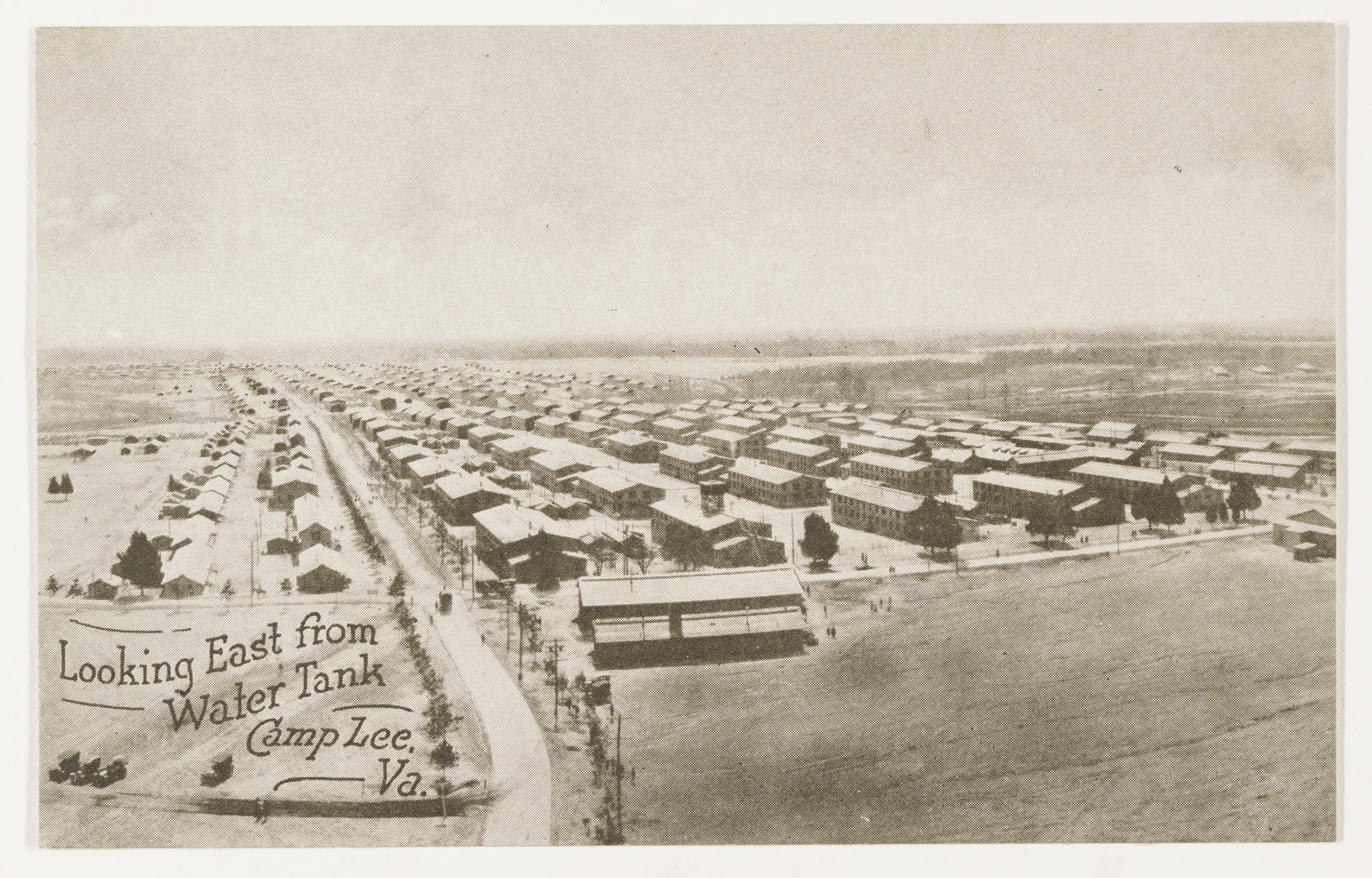
Looking East from the Water Tank, Camp Lee, VA

Just 18 days after a state of war with Germany was declared on April 6, 1917, the first Camp Lee was established as a state mobilization camp; it later became a division training camp.

In June 1917, construction began; within sixty days some 14,000 men were on the installation, home to the 155th Depot Brigade. The role of depot brigades was to receive recruits and draftees, then organize them and provide them with uniforms, equipment and initial military training. Depot brigades also received soldiers returning home at the end of the war and carried out their mustering out and discharges. When construction work ended, there were accommodations for 60,335 men. Camp Lee was one of the largest "cities" in Virginia in 1917, with more than 60,000 soldiers ("Doughboys") trained there prior to their departure for the Western Front.

Camp Lee was the mobilization center for the 80th Division, the Blue Ridge Division, which was organized there in August 1917. Because of significant common heritage in the past (Colonial Wars, Revolutionary War, and Civil War), units of the division were primarily residents of Pennsylvania, Virginia and West Virginia. The 80th Division then deployed to France; its approximately 23,000 soldiers arrived there by June 8,1918; it then saw major combat in the Second Battle of the Somme (1918) and the Meuse-Argonne Offensive.

Following the 80th Division's departure, the 37th Division began training at Camp Lee; however, their training was halted after the Armistice ended the need to continue deployment.

During World War I, the YMCA played a key role at Camp Lee by providing moral, recreational and lodging services for the thousands of young soldiers training there. For example, the YMCA downtown Richmond building regularly hosted nearly 300 men on Saturday nights and offered free stationery for soldiers to write home.

Included among the many facilities on the base was a large camp hospital situated on 58 acres of land. When the worldwide influenza epidemic reached Camp Lee in the fall of 1918, an estimated 10,000 soldiers were stricken; nearly 700 died during only a few weeks.

The U.S. Census of 1920 showed many soldiers stationed at Fort Lee. Ownership of the land was transferred to the Commonwealth of Virginia and designated a game preserve. Later, portions of the land were incorporated into the Petersburg National Battlefield and the Federal Correctional Institution, Petersburg.

In 1921, the camp was formally closed, and its buildings were torn down, except one – the so-called "White House". During the war, this two-story wood-framed structure had served as 80th Division Headquarters and as temporary residence for its Commander, Major General Adelbert Cronkhite. Years later, it became known as the "Davis House" in honor of the family that lived there in the 1930s and 40s.

=== World War II ===
In October 1940, the War Department ordered the construction of another Camp Lee on the site of the earlier installation. Built as rapidly as the first, construction was still ongoing when the Quartermaster Replacement Training Center (QMRTC) started operation in February 1941. Their number grew to 25,000 in 1942, and peaked at 35,000 in 1944.

While the QMRTC was getting underway, the Quartermaster School was transferred to Camp Lee. In October 1941, two months before Pearl Harbor, the Quartermaster School moved from Philadelphia to Camp Lee to begin training officers and non-commissioned officers in the art of military supply and service. A full program of courses was conducted, including Officer Candidate School. By the end of 1941, Camp Lee was the center of both basic and advanced training of quartermaster personnel; that continued throughout the war.

Over the course of the war, Camp Lee's population continued to increase until it became, in effect, the third largest "city" in Virginia, after Norfolk and Richmond. More than 50,000 officers attended Quartermaster Officer Candidate School. Over 300,000 quartermaster soldiers trained at the camp during the war. There was a Regional Hospital with scores of pavilions and literally miles of interlocking corridors capable of housing over 2,000 patients at a time. Additional operations included the Army Services Forces Training Center, the Quartermaster (Research & Development) Board, a Women's Army Corps training center, and for a while, a prisoner of war camp and the Medical Replacement Training Center. Camp Lee enjoyed a reputation as one of the most effective and best-run military installations in the country.

Camp Lee was also the home of a Medical Replacement Training Center (MRTC), but as the Quartermaster training increased, it was decided to relocate the MRTC to Camp Pickett. Later, the QMRTC was re-designated as an Army Services Forces Training Center, but it retained its basic mission of training Quartermaster personnel.

=== Post–World War II era ===
==== 1945–1950 ====
In 1946, the War Department announced that Camp Lee would be retained as the center for quartermaster training in the Army. The Quartermaster School continued operation, and in 1947, the Adjutant General's School moved there and remained until 1951.

The Women's Army Corps likewise established its premier training center there from 1948 to 1954. Also in 1948, the first permanent brick and mortar structure—the Post Theater (Powhatan Beaty Theater)—was constructed.

=== 1950–1965: Cold War Era growth ===
During the Korean War (1950–1953), tens of thousands of soldiers arrived at Fort Lee to receive logistics training before heading overseas. Official recognition of its permanent status was obtained in 1950 and the post was redesignated Fort Lee.

After the Korean War, progress was made on an ambitious permanent building program.

==== Air Force SAGE site ====
In 1956, the Fort Lee Air Force Station on post was selected for a Semi Automatic Ground Environment (SAGE) system direction center (DC) site, designated DC-04. The four-story block house was built to house two parallel AN/FSQ-7 Computers that could receive inputs from sensors on the East Coast and provide actionable information on incoming Soviet air threats.

- On 1 December 1956 the 4625th Air Defense Wing (SAGE) was activated.
- On 8 January 1957 the 4625th was redesignated as the newly activated Washington Air Defense Sector at Fort Lee.
- The WaADS was initially assigned to the 85th Air Division but on 1 September 1958 it was transferred to the 26th Air Division.
- In February 1959 the new Semi Automatic Ground Environment (SAGE) Direction Center (DC-04) became operational and oversaw Washington Air Defense Sector operations.37°15′09″N 077°19′21″W The day-to-day operations of the command were to train and maintain tactical units flying jet interceptor aircraft (F-101 Voodoo; F-102 Delta Dagger; F-106 Delta Dart) or interceptor missiles (CIM-10 Bomarc) in a state of readiness with training missions and series of exercises with Strategic Air Command and other units simulating interceptions of incoming Soviet aircraft.

==== First permanent structures built ====
The 1950s and 1960s witnessed almost nonstop modernization efforts as, one-by-one, Fort Lee's temporary wooden barracks, training facilities and housing units began giving way to permanent brick and cinderblock structures. New multi-storied barracks were built in the mid-50s, along with whole communities of Capehart housing for permanent party. In May 1961, the new three-story Quartermaster School, Mifflin Hall, was dedicated. Kenner Army Hospital opened in 1962, replacing the remnants of the old WWII-era facility, and the privately funded Quartermaster Museum opened its doors in 1963. Some years have seen far more change than others, but the overall process of modernization has continued ever since.

==== Locus for Quartermaster Training ====
The Quartermaster Training Center, created to supervise the training of Quartermaster personnel and troop units, brought an intensification of training activity within the Quartermaster Corps. As a result, the courses formerly taught at other locations were incorporated in the curriculum of the Quartermaster School.

Profound changes were evident at Fort Lee during 1962. The post became a Class 1 military installation under Second United States Army. The Quartermaster School became a part of the Continental Army Command service school system and was also selected to serve as the home of the Quartermaster Corps. The Second United States Army was inactivated at Fort Lee in 1966 until its reactivation at Fort Gillem, Georgia in 1983.

=== 1965–1990: Vietnam War and aftermath: Consolidation of Logistics under TRADOC ===
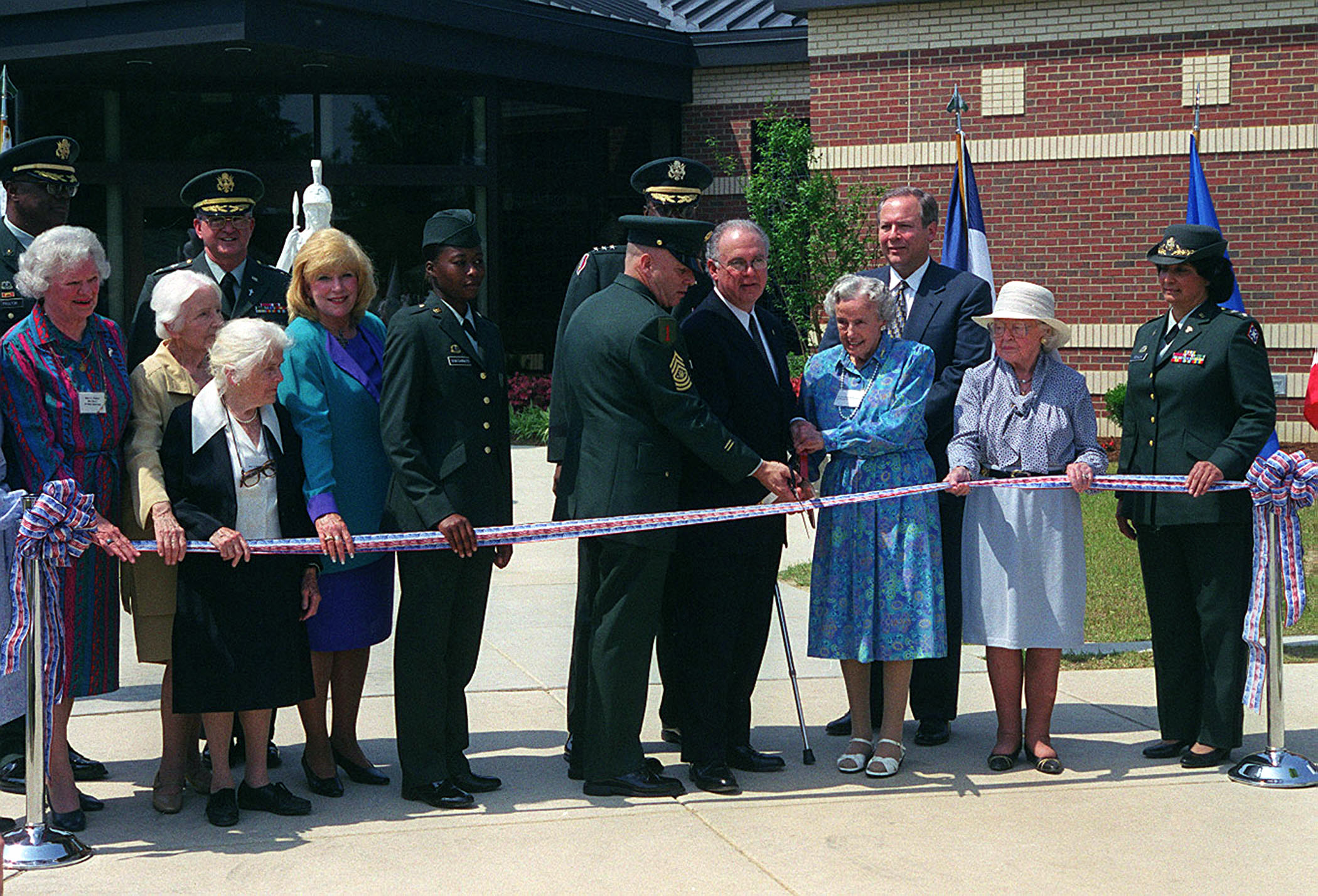
VIPs pictured during the Opening and Dedication Ceremony for the Army Women's Museum at Fort Lee, Virginia

The rapid logistics buildup in Vietnam after 1965 signaled an urgent need for many more soldiers in the Quartermaster Corps. Fort Lee responded by going into overdrive. For a time, the school maintained three shifts, and round-the-clock training. A Quartermaster Officer Candidate School opened in 1966 for the first time since World War II. A mock Vietnamese "village" was created on post to familiarize trainees with guerrilla tactics and the conditions in which they could expect to fight in the jungles of Southeast Asia. Part of the sixties-era Quartermaster training program also saw the first widespread local use of automated data processing equipment.

In July 1973, Fort Lee came under the control of U.S. Army Training and Doctrine Command. Additionally, the U.S. Army Logistics Center was established in 1973 to serve as an "integrating center" for the Quartermaster, Transportation, Ordnance, and Missile and Munitions Centers and Schools – the traditional Combat Service Support branches.

Again in 1990, there was a post reorganization and restructuring and the U.S. Army Logistics Center was re-designated the U.S. Army Combined Arms Support Command (CASCOM), and the CASCOM Commander became the Fort Lee Installation Commander as well.

=== 2001–2020: 9/11, BRAC, and Sustainment Center of Excellence ===
In May 2001, the U.S. Army Women's Museum (AWM) relocated to Fort Lee. It offered more than 13,000 sq. feet of gallery space and thousands of artifacts used to tell the long, proud history of women in the Army. Additionally, the installation hosted a growing number of tenant activities such as the Army Logistics Management Center (ALMC), Readiness Group Lee, Materiel Systems Analysis Activity, the General Leonard T. Gerow U.S. Army Reserve Center, the Defense Commissary Agency (DECA), USAR 80th Division, and several other Department of Army and Department of Defense activities.

==== Base Realignment and Closure 2005 ====
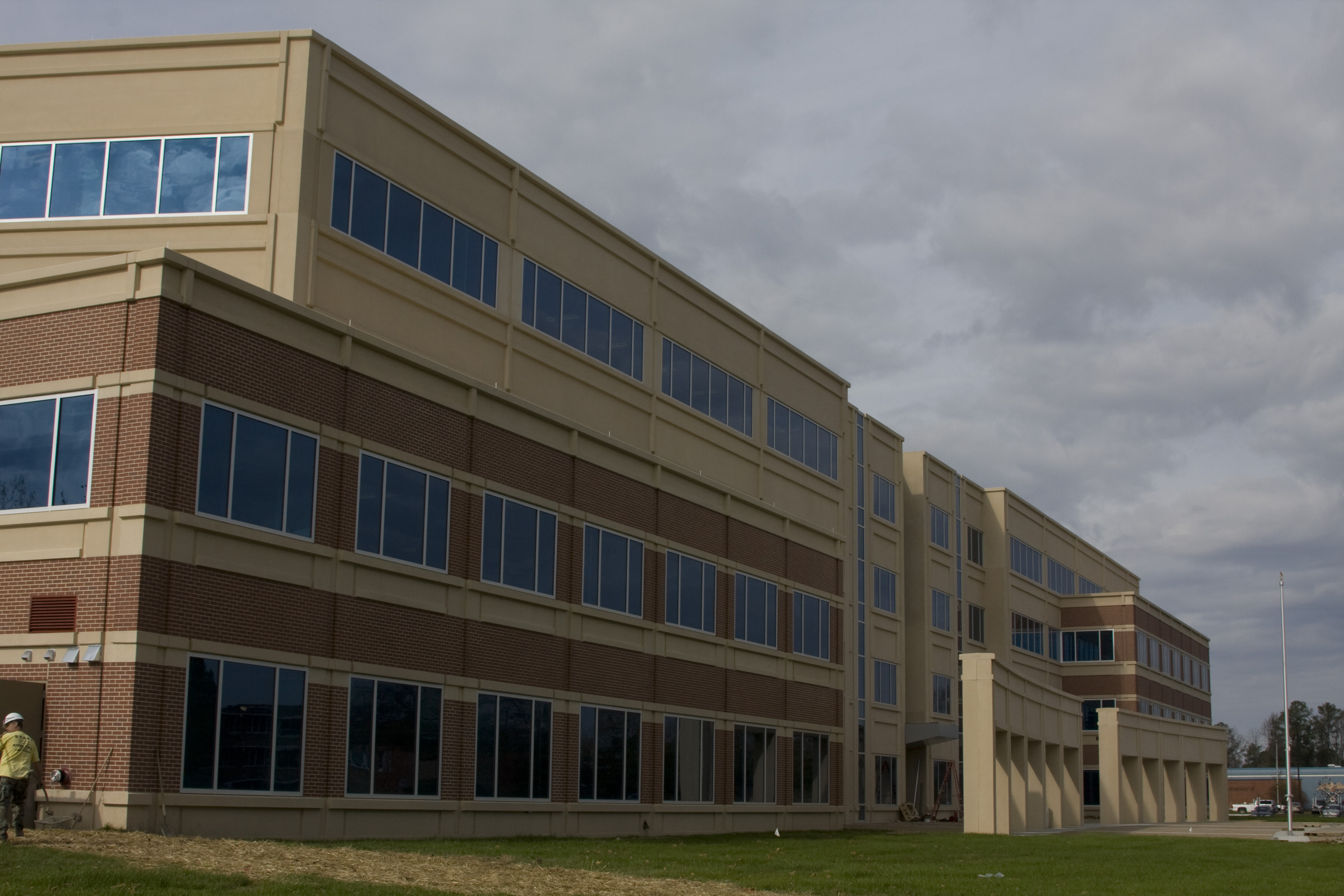
U.S. Army Command Arms Support Command (circa 2009)

In 2005, the Base Realignment and Closure (BRAC) law was passed by Congress. One of BRAC's requirements was the relocation of the United States Army Ordnance Corps headquarters, the United States Army Ordnance Munitions and Electronic Maintenance School (OMMS) from Aberdeen Proving Ground, the United States Army Ordnance Munitions and Electronic Maintenance School (OMEMS) from Redstone Arsenal, Alabama, and the Ordnance Museum to Fort Lee by September 2011. The transfer of artifacts from Aberdeen to Fort Lee began in August 2009, with the former museum now designated the U.S. Army Ordnance Training and Heritage Center at Fort Lee. Also, the headquarters of the U.S. Army Transportation Center and School from Fort Eustis was brought to the installation.

One of the principal parts of BRAC was the Sustainment Center of Excellence (SCoE) headquarters building project. In the summer of 2007, there was a ground-breaking ceremony on Sergeant Seay Field, the site of the new facility. The SCoE headquarters took 18 months to build and was formally dedicated in January 2009. It now houses the Combined Arms Support Command and command groups for the Quartermaster, Ordnance, and Transportation Corps. During a ceremony on 30 July 2010, the old CASCOM headquarters was officially retired, and the new building was proudly rededicated as "Mifflin Hall". To help make way for the structure, the First Logistical Command Memorial – which had been located on that site since 1974 – was carefully unmoored and moved to a more prominent spot facing the main post entrance.

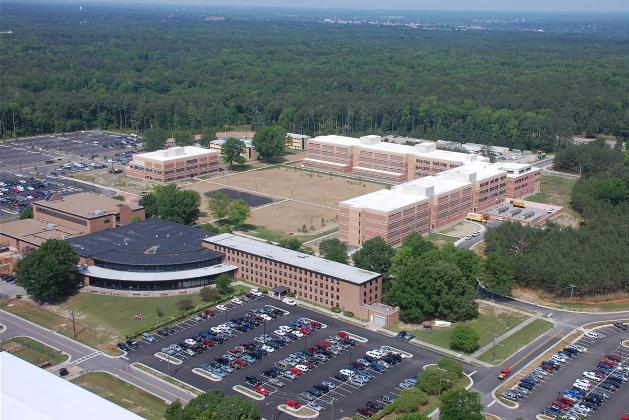
The Army Sustainment University is located on Fort Lee.

In addition, a new U.S. Army Logistics University was built and opened in July 2009 to centralize basic and advanced NCO, warrant officer, commissioned officer and government civilian leadership training for all Army sustainment branches. The 400,000-square-foot building now offers more than 200 courses and trains upward of 2,300 military and civilian students daily. Its International Studies program is attended by military personnel from more than 30 allied countries.

Fort Lee is the country's first army post to host a 'full-size' statue commemorating the service of women in the Army. The statue was unveiled in 2013.

The installation emerged as the center of logistics and sustainment for the U.S. Army. With the completion of the BRAC construction projects, the installation acquired 6.5 million square feet of new facilities and about 70,000 troops now train at Fort Lee each year. In 2017, the post marked its Centennial with a year-long celebration themed "A Century of Support to the Nation."

=== 2020s: Operation Allies Refuge and name changes ===
In July 2021, the post was tasked to support Operation Allies Refuge, with a goal of helping Afghan evacuees transition to a new life in the United States at the conclusion of the war in Afghanistan. The Department of Defense, through U.S. Northern Command, and in support of the Department of State and Department of Homeland Security, provided transportation, temporary housing, medical screening and general support for Afghan evacuees at military facilities across the country.

Fort Lee was the first of eight installations selected to support vulnerable Afghans and their families while they finished processing with immigration services, applied for work authorizations, and underwent medical care prior to resettlement in the U.S., and to qualify for a Special Immigrant Visa. Over 3,000 immigrants were temporarily housed on post by the end of November 2021, when the mission was concluded.

==== Renamed to Fort Gregg-Adams ====
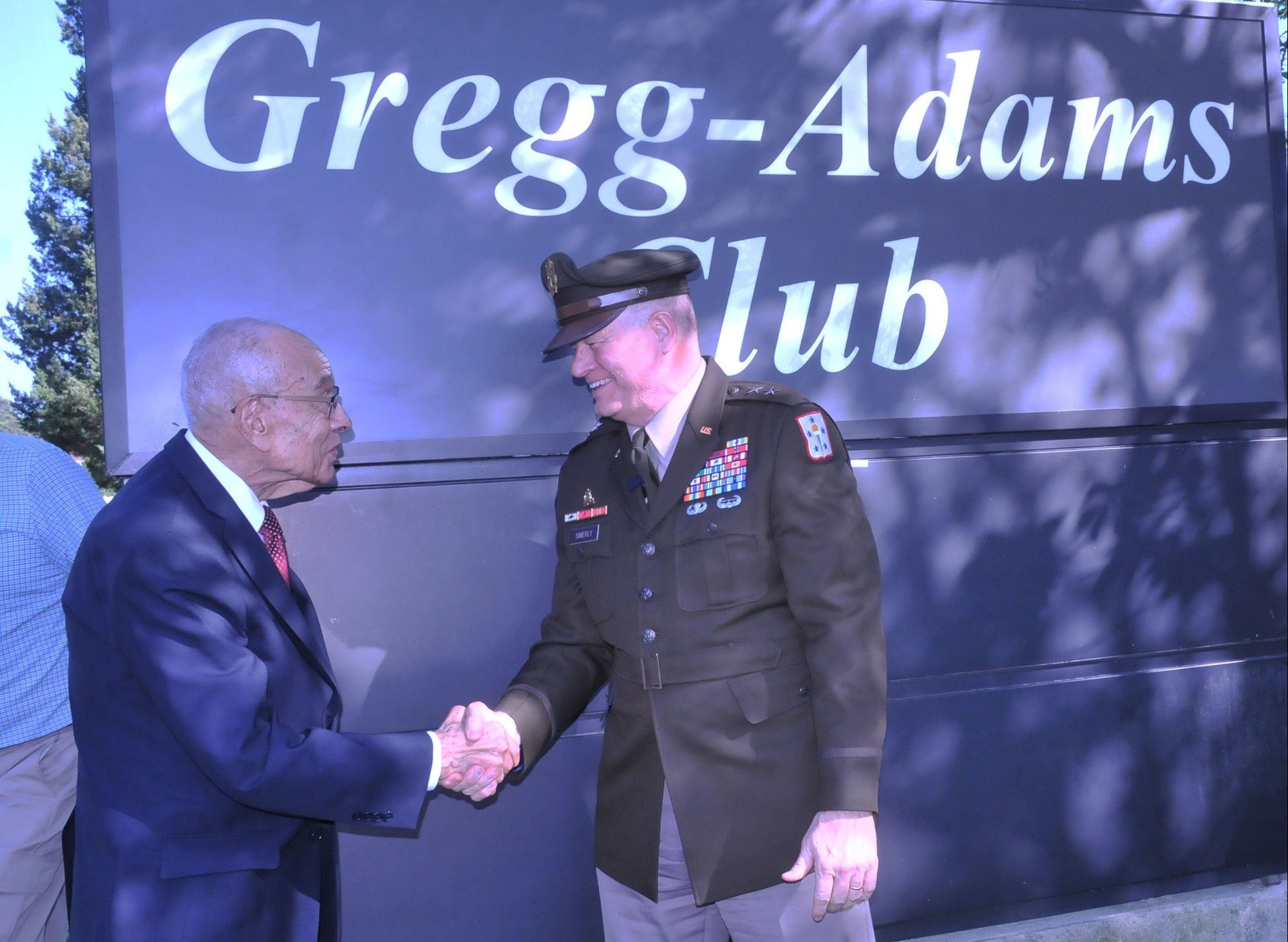
Retired Lt. Gen. Arthur J. Gregg, namesake of the renamed Gregg-Adams Club, being congratulated by Maj. Gen. Mark T. Simerly in April 2023

On 27 April 2023 during a redesignation ceremony the name of Fort Lee was changed to Fort Gregg-Adams (see above) in honor of two African American officers, Lt. Gen. Arthur J. Gregg and Lt. Col. Charity Adams.

Other infrastructure on the base was also renamed, including the officers' club into which Gregg had been denied entrance in 1950 as a young second lieutenant, at a time when discrimination and segregation were still being practiced against African American uniformed personnel despite an executive order to the contrary, signed by President Truman two years prior.

==== Renaming to Fort Lee ====
In June 2025, the U.S. Army announced that Fort Gregg-Adams would return to its former name, Fort Lee, but with Fitz Lee (1866–1899) as the new namesake. Fitz Lee served in the U.S. Army as a Buffalo Soldier during the Spanish–American War and was a Medal of Honor recipient.

== Geography ==
The base is mostly in unincorporated Prince George County, Virginia, and portions are in the independent city of Petersburg.

According to the United States Census Bureau, the census-designated place (entirely in Prince George County) has a total area of 8.4 square miles (22 km^{2}), all of it land.

== Demographics ==
Fort Lee, Virginia
- Census-designated place
- Motto: "Support starts here!"
- Location within Virginia Location within the United States
- Country: United States
- State: Virginia
- Counties: Prince George
- Elevation: 98 ft (30 m)

Population (2020)
  - Total: 9,874
- Time zone: UTC-5 (Eastern (EST))
  - Summer (DST): UTC-4 (EDT)
- GNIS feature ID: 1492869

Historical population
Census	Pop.	Note	%±
1970	12,435		—
1980	9,784		−21.3%
1990	6,895		−29.5%
2000	7,269		5.4%
2010	3,393		−53.3%
2020	9,874		191.0%
U.S. Decennial Census; 1950 1960 1970; 1980 1990 2000; 2010

Fort Lee was first listed as an unincorprated community in the 1970 U.S. census; and as a census designated place in the 1980 U.S. census.

=== Racial and ethnic composition ===
Fort Lee CDP, Virginia – Racial and ethnic composition Note: the US Census treats Hispanic/Latino as an ethnic category. This table excludes Latinos from the racial categories and assigns them to a separate category. Hispanics/Latinos may be of any race.
Race / Ethnicity (NH = Non-Hispanic)	Pop 2000	Pop 2010	Pop 2020	% 2000	% 2010	% 2020
White alone (NH)	2,669	1,167	3,867	36.72%	34.39%	39.16%
Black or African American alone (NH)	3,352	1,356	2,680	46.11%	39.96%	27.14%
Native American or Alaska Native alone (NH)	45	11	29	0.62%	0.32%	0.29%
Asian alone (NH)	159	59	372	2.19%	1.74%	3.77%
Native Hawaiian or Pacific Islander alone (NH)	28	65	96	0.39%	1.92%	0.97%
Other race alone (NH)	24	9	64	0.33%	0.27%	0.65%
Mixed race or Multiracial (NH)	162	162	415	2.23%	4.77%	4.20%
Hispanic or Latino (any race)	830	564	2,351	11.42%	16.62%	23.81%
Total	7,269	3,393	9,874	100.00%	100.00%	100.00%

=== 2000 census ===
As of the census of 2000, there were 7,269 people, 1,401 households, and 1,223 families residing in the CDP. The population density was 870.2 people per square mile (336.1/km^{2}). There were 1,445 housing units at an average density of 173.0/sq mi (66.8/km^{2}). The racial makeup of the CDP was 47.1% African American, 39.5% White, 0.7% Native American, 2.3% Asian, 0.4% Pacific Islander, 6.7% from other races, and 3.4% from two or more races. Hispanic or Latino of any race were 11.4% of the population.

There were 1,401 households, out of which 72.8% had children under the age of 18 living with them, 70.0% were married couples living together, 14.3% had a female householder with no husband present, and 12.7% were non-families. 11.4% of all households were made up of individuals, and 0.1% had someone living alone who was 65 years of age or older. The average household size was 3.27 and the average family size was 3.53.

In the CDP the population was spread out, with 27.9% under the age of 18, 34.0% from 18 to 24, 35.8% from 25 to 44, 2.1% from 45 to 64, and 0.2% who were 65 years of age or older. The median age was 22 years. For every 100 females there were 132.2 males. For every 100 females age 18 and over, there were 143.3 males.

The median income for a household in the CDP was $36,325, and the median income for a family was $40,197. Males had a median income of $27,511 versus $19,459 for females. The per capita income for the CDP was $12,448. About 6.3% of families and 7.6% of the population were below the poverty line, including 8.8% of those under age 18 and none of those age 65 or over.

== Current units ==
- Kenner Army Health Clinic
- 54th Quartermaster Battalion
- 111th Quartermaster Battalion
- 94th Training Division
- 345th Training Squadron (USAF)
- 262nd Quartermaster Battalion
- 266th Quartermaster Battalion

== Climate ==
The climate in this area is characterized by hot, humid summers and generally mild to cool winters. According to the Köppen Climate Classification system, Fort Lee has a humid subtropical climate, abbreviated "Cfa" on climate maps.

== Education ==
All areas in Prince George County, including on-post housing at Fort Lee, are within Prince George County Public Schools. The Department of Defense Education Activity (DoDEA) does not operate any schools on post at Fort Lee. The comprehensive high school of the county is Prince George High School.
