= Lakeland High School (Virginia) =

Coordinates: 36°43′15.8″N 76°39′38.1″W

Location
- 214 Kenyon Road; Suffolk, Virginia 23434; United States

Information
- School type: Public high school
- Founded: 1990
- School district: Suffolk Public Schools
- Superintendent: John B. Gordon III
- Principal: Amber Brown
- Grades: 9-12
- Enrollment: 1,048 (2020-2021)
- Language: English
- Campus: Suburban
- Colors: Columbia blue, navy blue & white
- Athletics conference: Virginia High School League; Class 3 Region A Southeastern District
- Mascot: Cavaliers
- Rival: King's Fork High School; Nansemond River High School
- Feeder schools: John F. Kennedy Middle; King's Fork Middle; Forest Glen Middle
- Website: lhs.spsk12.net

Lakeland High School is a public secondary school in Suffolk, Virginia, United States. It opened in September 1990 and originally consisted of students from the four former high schools of John F. Kennedy High School, Forest Glen High School, John Yeates High School, and Suffolk High School.

Lakeland opened its doors to approximately 1800 students. The student population swelled to nearly 2600 students in 2003, and in 2004 a new high school, King's Fork, opened. As a result of the population dropping in the 2004–2005 school year to about 1400 students. However, the following year, the school opened its doors to about 1800 students once again. The current principal of this school is Amber Brown, and the assistant principals, or administrators, are Marie Bullock, Dennis Tysinger, and Tim Kubinak.

== Athletics and extracurricular activities ==
- The Cavaliers compete within the AAA Southeastern District along with Deep Creek, Great Bridge High School, Hickory High School, Indian River High School, Oscar F. Smith High School, Western Branch High School, and crosstown rivals King's Fork High School and Nansemond River High School.
- The Lakeland "Cavaliers" are competitive in boys volleyball, boys soccer, track, baseball, basketball, and their best sport, field hockey. The field hockey program is a powerhouse. In 2010, the varsity field hockey team won their 11th consecutive Southeastern District Championship and earned their 10th Southeastern District Tournament Championship title. They moved on to make school history again when they became the Eastern Regional Champions and Virginia AAA State Field Hockey Champions, bringing home their first title in each. They finished an unbeaten season 24–0. Along with the state title, Lakeland Varsity Field Hockey Team also earned the State Sportsmanship Award for the entire State of Virginia for the second consecutive year. The Field Hockey team was ranked sixth in the entire nation according to topofthecircle.com in 2010.
- Starting January 26, 2009, Lakeland High School will make history and was the first school in Hampton Roads to have its own school TV show that is expected to be broadcast on the local Charter Cable 6. Its title, Lakeland 23434, parodied the popular teen drama, Beverly Hills, 90210 and was written to educate as much as entertain.

Lakeland's “Quiet Storm” marching band played in the National Memorial Day Parade on May 31, 2010. Lakeland was the only high school in Virginia invited to send a band to perform in the prestigious event.
