= Derrick Bryant =

American basketball player (born 1974)

Personal information
- Born: December 26, 1974 (age 51)
- Listed height: 6 ft 5 in (1.96 m)

Career information
- High school: Lakeland (Suffolk, Virginia); Nansemond River (Suffolk, Virginia)
- College: Norfolk State (1992–1996)
- Playing career: 1996–2006
- Position: Guard

Career history
- 1996–1997: KFÍ
- 1997–1998: AB Contern
- 1998–2000: CABA
- 2000–2003: CB Tarragona
- 2003–2004: Ben Hur Rafaela
- 2004–2005: CB Valls
- 2005–2006: Ciclista Juninense

Derrick Shawn Bryant (born December 26, 1974) is an American former basketball player. He played college basketball for Norfolk State University before playing professionally in Europe and South America for ten years.

== High school career ==
Bryant attended Kennedy High School in Suffolk before enrolling in Lakeland High School in 1990. As a high school senior, Bryant was an all-state selection and averaged 22.1 points, 12.3 rebounds and 5.1 assists for Nansemond River High School, leading them to a 27-1 record and the state Group AA championship.

== College career ==
After initially enrolling at Bucknell University in Lewisburg, Pennsylvania, where he attended class for four days, he transferred to Norfolk State University, where he played from 1992 to 1996. He finished tenth on the Spartans' all- time scoring list (1,710 points) and sixth in rebounds (1,034), leading NSU to the Division II Elite Eight in 1994 and the Final Four in 1995.

== Professional career ==
In October 1996, Bryant signed with newly promoted Úrvalsdeild karla club KFÍ, replacing injured Euan Roberts. For the season he averaged 26.9 points and 12.1 rebounds, while the team missed out on the playoffs with a loss in the last game of the regular season. He also averaged 24.7 points and 16.0 rebounds in the Icelandic Cup, helping KFÍ advance to the Final Four where the team bowed out against Keflavík. After being invited to summer training camps with the Indiana Pacers and Dallas Mavericks, he played for AB Contern during the 1997–1998 season.

He played for CB Tarragona between 2001 and 2003 and for Ben Hur Rafaela in Argentina during the 2003-04 season, where he averaged 16.2 points, 4.8 rebounds and 1.7 assists and helped his team advance to the playoff quarterfinals. In 2005, Bryant signed with Ciclista Juninense.

== Later life ==
Following his basketball career, Bryant went back to school to receive his teaching license and did that for another 10 years, teaching computers and technology. He then spent three years as assistant principal at King's Fork High School before taking over as principal in 2019.
