= Nansemond River High School =

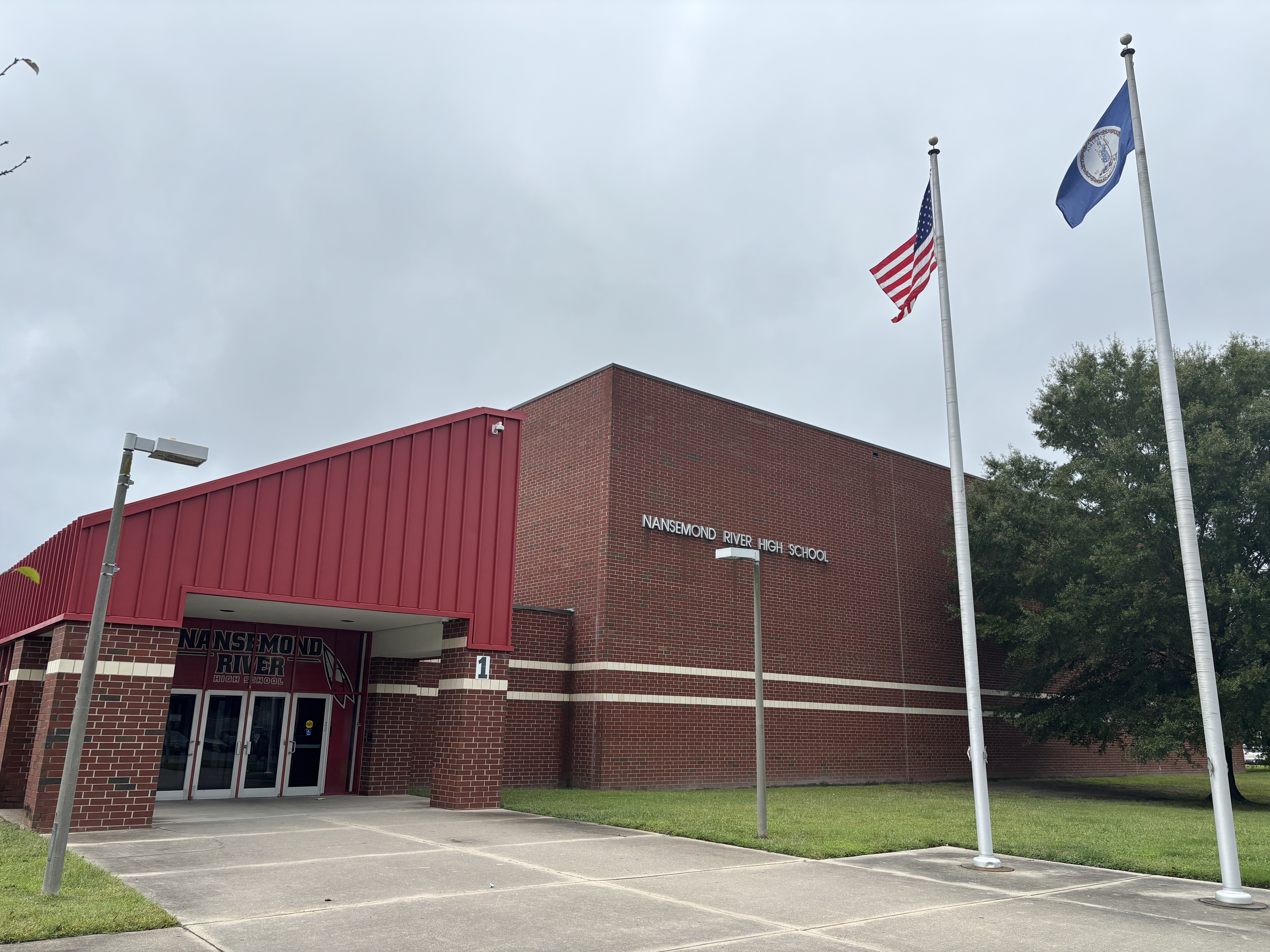

Location
- 3301 Nansemond Parkway; Suffolk, Virginia 23434; United States; 36°48′6.6″N 76°31′5.3″W

Information
- School type: Public high school
- Motto: Building for the Future
- Founded: September 4, 1990; 35 years ago
- School district: Suffolk Public Schools
- Superintendent: John B Gordon, III
- Principal: Shawn Green
- Teaching staff: 109
- Grades: 9-12
- Enrollment: 1,709 (2026-27)
- Student to teacher ratio: 15.68 (2026-27)
- Language: English
- Campus: Suburban
- Colors: Red, black and white
- Athletics conference: Southeastern District; Eastern Region
- Mascot: Warrior
- Rivals: King's Fork High School; Lakeland High School
- Feeder schools: Northern Shores Elementary; Creekside Elementary; Nansemond Parkway Elementary; Florence Bowser Elementary; John Yeates Middle School; Col. Fred Cherry Middle School
- Website: Official Site

Nansemond River High School is a public secondary school in Suffolk, Virginia, United States. It serves grades 9 through 12 as part of Suffolk Public Schools. Opened in 1990, the school primarily serves the northeastern portion of the city.

== History ==
Nansemond River High School opened in September 1990 amid the consolidation of Suffolk’s former independent school systems. Its initial student body was drawn largely from John F. Kennedy Middle School and John Yeates Middle School, both of which had previously operated as high schools prior to reorganization. The school opened with approximately 1,700 students.

Enrollment peaked at nearly 2,000 students in 2003. In 2004, the opening of King's Fork High School resulted in rezoning, reducing Nansemond River’s enrollment to roughly 1,100 students during the 2004–2005 academic year. Enrollment stabilized the following year at approximately 1,200 students and has since fluctuated with continued residential development in northern Suffolk.

== School structure ==
The school operates on an odd–even block schedule. Instruction is delivered by approximately 85 faculty members. Seniors complete a required senior portfolio as part of English 12, with exemptions available for certain Advanced Placement students.

== Extracurricular activities ==
The school sponsors a range of extracurricular programs, including band, choir, theatre, Junior Reserve Officers' Training Corps (JROTC), and various academic clubs.

=== Athletics ===
Nansemond River’s athletic teams, known as the Warriors, compete in the Virginia High School League (VHSL) Class 5A Southeastern District. With Deep Creek, Great Bridge High School, Hickory High School, Indian River High School, Oscar Smith High School, Western Branch High School, King's Fork High School and Lakeland High School. Sports offered include football, basketball, baseball, softball, soccer, volleyball, field hockey, track and field, cross country, wrestling, swimming, cheerleading, and others.

- In 2016, the women's track and field program was #1 in Virginia across all classifications. During the Indoor National Championships, the team won the 4x200 relay.
- In 2022, the competition cheer team won the 5A Regional championships. with Gloucester High School placing second.

== Notable alumni ==
- Brandon Lowe (class of 2012), baseball player
- Pheldarius Payne (class of 2018), defensive tackle for the Houston Texans
