= Josh Sweat =

American football player (born 1997)

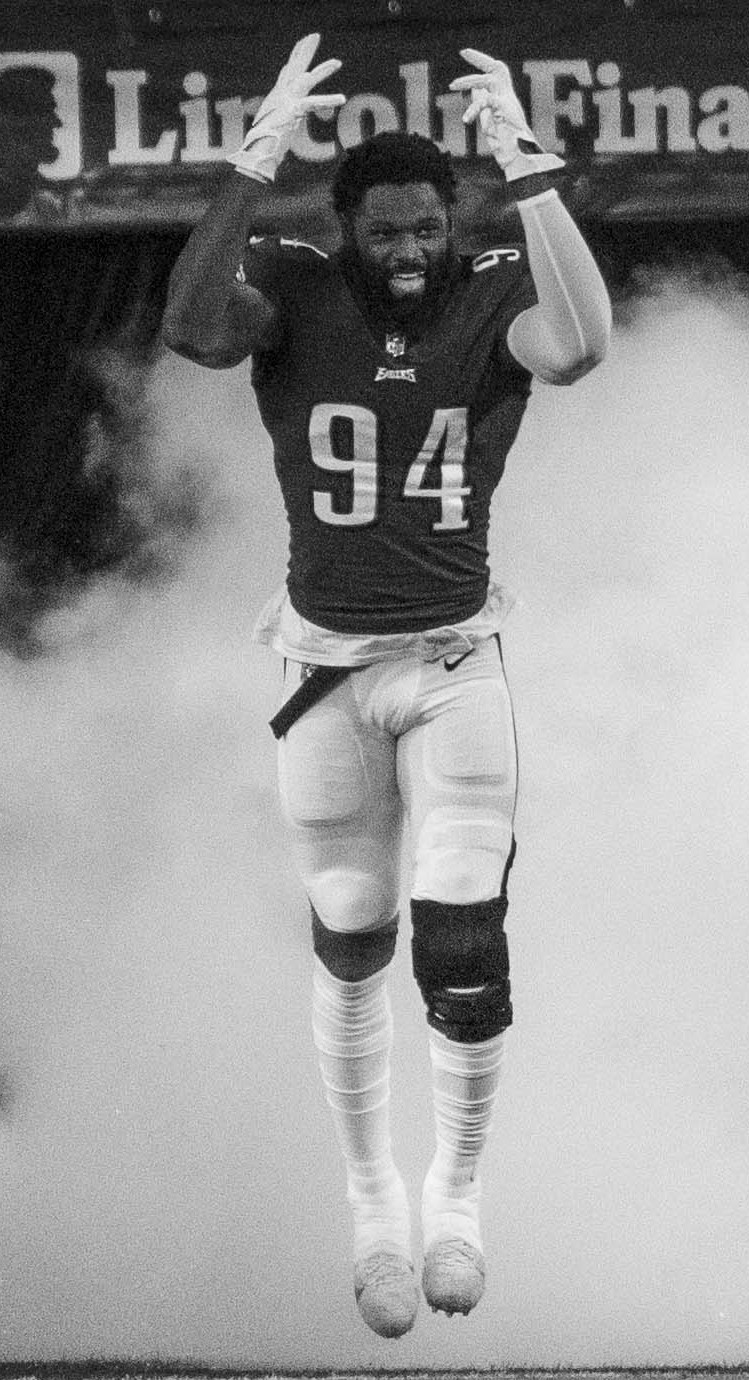
- Sweat with the Philadelphia Eagles in 2021

No. 10 – Arizona Cardinals
- Position: Outside linebacker
- Roster status: Active

Personal information
- Born: March 29, 1997 (age 29); Chesapeake, Virginia, U.S.
- Listed height: 6 ft 5 in (1.96 m)
- Listed weight: 265 lb (120 kg)

Career information
- High school: Oscar F. Smith (Chesapeake)
- College: Florida State (2015–2017)
- NFL draft: 2018: 4th round, 130th overall pick

Career history
- Philadelphia Eagles (2018–2024); Arizona Cardinals (2025–present)

Awards and highlights
- Super Bowl champion (LIX); Pro Bowl (2021)

Career NFL statistics as of 2025
- Total tackles: 267
- Sacks: 55
- Forced fumbles: 11
- Fumble recoveries: 1
- Pass deflections: 13
- Interceptions: 1
- Defensive touchdowns: 1
- Stats at Pro Football Reference

Josh Brandon Sweat (born March 29, 1997) is an American professional football outside linebacker for the Arizona Cardinals of the National Football League (NFL). He played college football for the Florida State Seminoles, before being selected by the Philadelphia Eagles in the fourth round of the 2018 NFL draft.

== Early life ==
A native of Chesapeake, Virginia, Sweat attended Oscar F. Smith High School where he was teammates with Andrew Brown. In his junior year, he recorded 94 tackles and helped Oscar Smith to march undefeated into the 2013 VHSL 6A state championship game, where they were upset by Centreville High School 35–6. In offseason football camps, Sweat impressed with his athleticism and triggered comparisons to Jadeveon Clowney.

Starting his senior year as the top-rated prospect in the country by ESPN, Sweat registered 25 tackles, 11 tackles for loss, and eight sacks in the first two games of the season. During the third game of the season, against Western Branch High School, Sweat suffered a torn ACL which ended his season. He underwent reconstructive surgery in New York performed by New York Giants team physician Russell Warren, before graduating from Oscar Smith in December 2014 to enroll early in college.

Initially being regarded the top prospect of his class, Sweat fell in the rankings after his injury. He dropped to No. 11 in ESPN's final ranking of the class of 2015, but retained his five-star status. Sweat committed to Florida State over offers from Virginia Tech, Georgia, Ohio State, and Oregon.

== College career ==
Sweat played college football at Florida State. As a freshman in 2015, Sweat played 12 games with 41 tackles, 5 sacks, an interception, 2 passes defended, and 3 fumble recoveries. As a sophomore in 2016, Sweat played 11 games with 41 tackles, 7 sacks, a pass defended, and a fumble recovery. As a junior in 2017, Sweat played 12 games with 56 tackles, 5.5 sacks, and 3 passes defended. On January 4, 2018, Sweat announced that he would forgo his senior year and enter the 2018 NFL draft.

== Professional career ==
Pre-draft measurables
Height	Weight	Arm length	Hand span	Wingspan	40-yard dash	10-yard split	20-yard split	20-yard shuttle	Three-cone drill	Vertical jump	Broad jump	Bench press
6 ft 4 3/4 in (1.95 m)	251 lb (114 kg)	34 5/8 in (0.88 m)	10 1/4 in (0.26 m)	7 ft 0 1/8 in (2.14 m)	4.53 s	1.55 s	2.61 s	4.28 s	6.95 s	39.5 in (1.00 m)	10 ft 4 in (3.15 m)	16 reps
All values from NFL Combine/Pro Day

=== Pre-draft ===
At the 2018 NFL Combine, Sweat ranked first among defensive linemen in the 40-yard dash and vertical jump.

=== Philadelphia Eagles ===
Sweat was selected by the Philadelphia Eagles in the fourth round (130th overall) in the 2018 NFL draft. The 130th overall pick was acquired by the Eagles in a trade that sent Sam Bradford to the Minnesota Vikings. He played just 68 snaps across 9 games, until he was placed on the injured reserve on December 11, 2018 with an ankle injury.

Ahead of the 2019 season, veteran teammate and fellow edge rusher Chris Long announced his retirement, setting Sweat up to assume a major role in the team's defensive rotation. However, he would be beaten out in training camp by Derek Barnett for the starting spot, and would be further forced to compete for snaps with Vinny Curry. Sweat would end up playing in all 16 games with zero starts, and recording just 21 tackles and four sacks.

In 2020, Sweat would find himself still primarily playing a rotational role behind Barnett. He would go on to play in 14 games with three starts, recording six sacks, 38 tackles, and three forced fumbles. He would injure his wrist in the week 15 matchup against the Arizona Cardinals, and was placed on injured reserve for the second time in his career on December 26, 2020, one day before the Eagles' week 16 game.

On September 18, 2021, Sweat agreed to a three-year, $40 million extension with the Eagles. Sweat would finally gain the opportunity become a primary starter after teammate Brandon Graham tore his achilles tendon in the Eagles' week 2 matchup against the San Francisco 49ers. This opportunity would lead to Sweat having his breakout season, playing in all 16 games with 13 starts, recording seven and a half sacks, 45 tackles, and one forced fumble. A few months later, he would be named to his first Pro Bowl as an alternative, replacing Nick Bosa who was unable to attend due to an injury. Sweat missed the Eagles' Wild Card matchup against the Tampa Bay Buccaneers after undergoing an emergency surgery to repair a ruptured artery in his stomach. Sweat would be medically cleared in time for the Pro Bowl.

In 2022, Sweat would both play in and start all 16 games, in which he would record 48 tackles, 11 sacks, one forced fumble, and one interception which he returned for a touchdown. Sweat helped the Eagles reach Super Bowl LVII, where he recorded one tackle in the Eagles' 38–35 loss to the Kansas City Chiefs.

In 2023, Sweat would play in 17 games, and for the second straight season, start all of them, where he would record six and a half sacks, 43 tackles, and two forced fumbles. The Eagles would ultimately be defeated 32–9 by the Tampa Bay Buccaneers in the Wild Card round.

In 2024, Sweat played in 16 games with 15 starts, where he recorded eight sacks and 41 tackles. Across the season, Sweat would become a central defensive piece of the Eagles' effort to return to the Super Bowl in Super Bowl LIX. In the game, Sweat recorded 2.5 sacks, 6 tackles, and 3 quarterback hits, helping to secure a 40–22 revenge victory over the Kansas City Chiefs. He was ranked 95th by his fellow players on the NFL Top 100 Players of 2025.

=== Arizona Cardinals ===
On March 10, 2025, the Arizona Cardinals signed Sweat to a four-year deal worth up to $76.4 million with $41 million guaranteed. Sweat recorded a career high 12 sacks in his first season with Arizona.

On July 24 2026, Sweat was put on the PUP due to a knee injury, the specifics of which are undisclosed but is not serious.

== NFL career statistics ==
Legend
	Won the Super Bowl
	Led the league
**Bold**	Career high

=== Regular season ===
Year	Team	Games		Tackles					Fumbles				Interceptions					
Year	Team	GP	GS	Comb	Solo	Ast	Sack	TFL	FF	FR	Yds	TD	Int	Yds	Avg	Lng	TD	PD
2018	PHI	9	0	1	1	0	0.0	0	0	0	0	0	0	0	0.0	0	0	0
2019	PHI	16	0	21	16	5	4.0	7	0	0	0	0	0	0	0.0	0	0	1
2020	PHI	14	3	38	24	14	6.0	9	3	0	0	0	0	0	0.0	0	0	2
2021	PHI	16	13	45	19	**26**	7.5	7	1	0	0	0	0	0	0.0	0	0	**4**
2022	PHI	16	16	**48**	**31**	17	11.0	**15**	1	0	0	0	**1**	**42**	**42.0**	**42**	**1**	1
2023	PHI	17	17	43	30	13	6.5	7	2	0	0	0	0	0	0.0	0	0	1
2024	PHI	16	15	41	27	14	8.0	9	0	0	0	0	0	0	0.0	0	0	2
2025	ARI	17	17	30	20	10	**12.0**	13	**4**	**1**	**2**	0	0	0	0.0	0	0	2
Career		121	81	267	168	99	55.0	67	11	1	2	0	1	42	42.0	42	1	13

=== Postseason ===
Year	Team	Games		Tackles					Fumbles				Interceptions					
Year	Team	GP	GS	Comb	Solo	Ast	Sack	TFL	FF	FR	Yds	TD	Int	Yds	Avg	Lng	TD	PD
2018	PHI	0	0	DNP														
2019	PHI	1	0	0	0	0	0.0	0	0	0	0	0	0	0	0.0	0	0	0
2021	PHI	0	0	DNP														
2022	PHI	3	3	7	4	3	1.5	1	**1**	0	0	0	0	0	0.0	0	0	0
2023	PHI	1	1	4	3	1	1.0	1	0	0	0	0	0	0	0.0	0	0	0
2024	PHI	4	4	**10**	**5**	**5**	**2.5**	**3**	0	0	0	0	0	0	0.0	0	0	0
Career		9	8	21	12	9	5.0	5	1	0	0	0	0	0	0.0	0	0	0
