= Grassfield High School =

Location
- 2007 Grizzly Trail; Chesapeake, Virginia 23323; United States; 36°42′50.5″N 76°18′50.3″W

Information
- School type: Public, High School
- Founded: 2007
- School district: Chesapeake City Public Schools
- Superintendent: Jared A. Cotton
- Principal: Brian Haughinberry
- Teaching staff: 144.04 (FTE)
- Grades: 9–12
- Enrollment: 2,306 (2023–24)
- Student to teacher ratio: 16.01
- Language: English
- Campus: 100-acre (0.40 km^{2}) Suburban
- Colors: Red, White, and Navy Blue
- Athletics conference: Virginia High School League; Class 6 Region A Southeastern District
- Mascot: Grizzlies, Mr. Griz
- Rival: Great Bridge High School; Hickory High School; Deep Creek High School
- Feeder schools: Cedar Road Elementary School; Hickory Elementary School; Deep Creek Central Elementary School; Grassfield Elementary School; Great Bridge Middle School; Hickory Middle School; Hugo A. Owens Middle School
- Website: Official Site

Grassfield High School is a public high school located in Chesapeake, Virginia, USA, and is administered by Chesapeake City Public Schools. It was built to ease overcrowding at Deep Creek High School, Great Bridge High School, and Hickory High School. Grassfield, along with Western Branch High School and Oscar Smith High School, features the latest technology available in the school district. Grassfield is also the City of Chesapeake's location for the STEM (Science, Technology, Engineering, and Mathematics) school as various high school students around the city can apply for admission into the program.

== History ==
By 2004 the school district was planning to spend $63.6 million to build Grassfield, and anticipated it would open in 2007.

== Extracurriculars ==
=== Athletics ===
Grassfield's 24 varsity sports teams compete in Conference 2 of the VHSL's Group 6A South Region.

- Fall – Cheerleading, Boys and Girls Cross Country, Field Hockey, Football, Boys and Girls Golf, Boys and Girls Volleyball, Marching Band
- Winter – Boys and Girls Basketball, Cheerleading, Gymnastics, Boys and Girls Indoor Track, Boys and Girls Swimming and Diving, Wrestling, Winter Guard, Indoor Percussion, and Crew (rowing)
- Spring – Baseball, Boys and Girls Tennis, Boys and Girls Soccer, Softball, Boys Lacrosse, and Boys and Girls Outdoor Track

In November 2007 Grassfield held a home run derby to raise money for their athletic teams. It included B.J. Upton, Justin Upton, Ryan Zimmerman, David Wright, Michael Cuddyer, and Mark Reynolds. The Girls Varsity Volleyball team made school history in their fall 2008 season by winning both the regular season and district tournament titles, and receiving the first district championship banner in the gym.

==== Football ====
The football team is currently coached by Michael Biehl.

Year	Division	Region	District	W	L	Playoff Seed	Head Coach
2007	5	Eastern	Southeastern	1*	9	Did not qualify	Martin Asprey
2008	5	Eastern	Southeastern	7	4	6th	Martin Asprey
2009	6	Eastern	Southeastern	9	3	4th	Martin Asprey
2010	6	Eastern	Southeastern	8	3	5th	Martin Asprey
2011	6	Eastern	Southeastern	10	2	4th	Martin Asprey
2012	6	Eastern	Southeastern	8	3	6th	Martin Asprey
2013	6	Eastern	Southeastern	9	3	4th	Martin Asprey
2014	6	Eastern	Southeastern	4	6	Did not qualify	Martin Asprey
2015	6	Eastern	Southeastern	8	4	5th	Martin Asprey
2016	6	Eastern	Southeastern	9	3	7th	Martin Asprey
2017	6	6A	Southeastern	3	7	Did not qualify	Martin Asprey
2018	6	6A	Southeastern	4	6	Did not qualify	Martin Asprey
2019	6	6A	Southeastern	5	6	6th	Martin Asprey
2020**	6	6A	Southeastern	3	4	Did not qualify	Martin Asprey
2021	6	6A	Southeastern	1	9	Did not qualify	Martin Asprey
2022	6	6A	Southeastern	1	9	Did not qualify	Joe Jones
2023	6	6A	Southeastern	3	7	Did not qualify	Joe Jones
2024	6	6A	Southeastern	2	9	Did not qualify	Joe Jones
2025	6	6A	Southeastern	0	10	Did not qualify	Michael Biehl
2026	6	6A	Southeastern	4	6	Did not qualify	Michael Biehl

_{(*) Nansemond River High School forfeited their victory due to an ineligible player.}

_{(**) VHSL moved the 2020 season from autumn to spring and reduced the number of games played due to COVID-19 restrictions.}

==== Swimming ====
During the 2017-2018 Grassfield Swim season the girls team secured a first place victory at regionals.

==== Wrestling ====
In February 2009 the Grassfield wrestling team secured 1st place for the regular season and won Southeastern District tournament title. During February, they finished 2nd in the Eastern Regional Tournament and 4th at the AAA state tournament. In 2009, the Grizzlies had 2 state champions: Caleb Richardson in the 103 lb (47 kg) class (The Grizzlies' 1st male state champion) and Andrew Clement in the 171 pounds (78 kg) class.

=== Drama ===
In its first year, the Grassfield High School Drama Department collected many awards for its performances. Some awards include Second place at the state level for VHSL Theatre competition, best actor awards and best ensemble from the Greek play "Medea". In their second year, The Grassfield Theater Company travelled to the VTA and got second place in the state, first in districts regionals and state for VHSL, winning two best actor awards and first place overall for their production of John Steinbeck's The Pearl. Grassfield has consistently held one of the top theatre departments in the region, winning 1st place in the VHSL Southeast District competition thirteen years consecutively, and once the reorganization of VHSL, the theatre company has been the Conference 2 champion, regional champion in 2014, and garnered VHSL State Championships for Region 6A in 2014 with their production of "King Midas and the Golden Touch" as well as their original play "Digital Breadcrumbs" in 2016.

=== Choral department ===
The Singers of Grassfield High School received a rating of superior in their inaugural year, and are a participants in various other performances in Chesapeake and Southeastern Virginia. All three of Grassfield High School's choirs, the Select Women's Treble Singers, Chamber Singers, Concert Singers and Freshmen Choir all received a rating of superior in their second year of existence. The Select women's and Chamber are the honors chior that are more evolved in competition and harder music. Both choirs promoting musicianship and pushing the students.

The choir is taught by Elise Krepcho, who creates a positive environment for all the students. The choir holds an annual variety show to raise money for the choral department.

=== Band Program ===
In their inaugural year, both the Grassfield High School Freshman and Upperclassmen Concert bands received superior ratings at VBODA District IV band festival. In their second year, the Freshman and Upperclassmen Concert bands received ratings of excellent, and the newly created Symphonic Band received a Superior rating. This gave Grassfield the title of Virginia All-State honors band, for receiving Superior ratings for their Marching and top-ranked Concert bands. In 2019 the Symphonic Band and Concert band both received superior ratings.

In the beginning of 2021, new changes were proposed to the Grassfield High School Band Program in an effort to try and earn honor band credits for the students. The Symphonic Band was rebranded as the new Wind Ensemble, while the Concert Band was named as the new Symphonic Band. These changes were put into effect at the beginning of the 2021-2022 school year. The Marching Grizzlies received a superior rating in the 2021 VBODA District IV Marching Band Assessment, which gave Grassfield High School the first half of the title of Virginia All-State Honors Band. The Freshman Band and the Symphonic Band both earned excellent ratings at the 2022 VBODA District IV Band assessment, while the newly established Wind Ensemble received a superior rating; earning Grassfield High School another title of Virginia All-State Honors Band.

=== Orchestra Program ===
The Grassfield High School Orchestra Program is in its 15th year of existence, and is made up of three main performing groups that span approximately 216 students. In the 2009-2010 school year, the Grassfield High School Chamber Orchestra won the coveted Music Festivals Grand National Championship as the top performing group to participate in their clinic/workshop division. In 2016, the chamber orchestra was crowned Music Festival National Champions. Beginning in its inaugural year, all three ensembles (the Grassfield Freshman Orchestra, Grassfield Concert Orchestra, and Grassfield Chamber Orchestra) continue to score and receive superior ratings at the VBODA District IV orchestra assessment festival. Grassfield High School currently is also the host school of the District IV VBODA orchestra assessment, held usually in early March. Notably, the Grassfield Orchestra Program continues to place many of its students into both regional, state, and national ensembles each year such as the Virginia Southeastern Senior Regional Orchestra, and the Virginia All-State Orchestra.

The Grassfield Orchestra Program also covers another performing group, a string rock and pop group called Polyphonix. The group consists of members of the Grassfield Fine Arts Department, and is focused on performing popular and rock tunes for audiences. In the 2022-2023 school year, the Grassfield Philharmonic Orchestra was established, under the direction of Keith Dublin, the Band Director, and Steven Vutsinas, the Orchestra Director. The new symphonic orchestra has performed at the Grassfield Orchestra Spring Concert in 2023, and at the Chesapeake Public Schools' Grassfield High School Graduation at Chartaway Arena at Old Dominion University.

The Grassfield High School Orchestra Program is under the direction of Steven Vutsinas, acting as not only the Orchestra Director, but also as the Fine Arts Department Co-Chair at Grassfield High School. Mr. Steve Vutsinas or, “Mr. V” as he is called by his students, is a 1988 graduate of the East Carolina School of Music. Mr. V was Grassfield High School’s Teacher of the Year and was also a finalist for Chesapeake Teacher of the Year in 2014. Mr. Vutsinas was also selected as a top ten finalist for the inaugural Grammy Music Educator of the Year in 2014 from a list of over 33,000 music educators from across the United States.

== Notable alumni ==
- Justice Bigbie – Minor league baseball outfielder
- Grant Holloway – American track and field athlete
- Patrick Jones II – National Football League player
