= Deep Creek High School =

Location
- 2900 Margaret Booker Drive; Chesapeake, Virginia 23323; United States; 36.75409°N 76.35234°W

Information
- School type: Public high school
- Motto: "Where Pride Runs Deep"
- Founded: 1908
- School district: Chesapeake City Public Schools
- NCES District ID: 5100810
- Superintendent: Jared A. Cotton
- School number: (757) 558-5302
- Principal: Kinyatta Garrett
- Staff: 113.00 (FTE)
- Grades: 9-12
- Enrollment: 1,597 (2022-2023)
- Student to teacher ratio: 14.13
- Language: English
- Hours in school day: 7 Hours
- Colors: Purple and White
- Athletics conference: Virginia High School League; AAA Eastern Region; Southeastern District
- Mascot: Hornet
- Nickname: Hornets
- Rival: Great Bridge High School; Western Branch High School Grassfield High School; Indian River High School
- Feeder schools: Camelot Elementary; Deep Creek Elementary; Deep Creek Central Elementary School; Treakle Elementary; Deep Creek Middle; Hugo Owens Middle School
- Website: https://www.cpschools.com/o/dch
- Last updated: February 8, 2024

Deep Creek High School is a public secondary school in Chesapeake, Virginia. It is part of Chesapeake City Public Schools and is located on 2900 Margaret Booker Drive.

== History ==
In 1845, Norfolk County, Virginia constructed the first public school in Deep Creek, Virginia. It was the second school to be constructed in Norfolk County from funds provided by the General Assembly for public education. The one-room school was across from the present day Deep Creek Intermediate School. The school was closed and destroyed by federal troops during the Civil War.

In 1870, a school was erected on Old Gilmerton Road. Several years later, a one-room school facing Galberry Road behind and adjacent to Flemming's Store was constructed. In 1897, a wing was added to separately house the older students. In 1908, the legislature provided funds for the construction of a one-story brick school on the site of the previous intermediate school. Schools from the outlying areas were consolidated and students from St. Juliens Creek, Millsville, Grassfield, and Gilmerton were transported by horse-drawn school buses to Deep Creek School.

In 1910, a two-story brick building was constructed on the site of the intermediate school. The first class of seniors was graduated from Deep Creek High School in 1911. Building additions were made in 1923, 1947, and 1952. In 1955, Deep Creek High School was separated from Deep Creek School by the construction of a million dollar secondary building to house grades 7-12 on Deal Drive.

In the 1940s, with the assistance of the Rosenwald Fund, a four-room elementary school was built for black students in the Deep Creek borough. Black students from Deep Creek attended Providence High School in South Norfolk, which later became incorporated into Carver High School and Gilmerton High School. Both schools later became incorporated into Crestwood High School when it opened in 1954. The black elementary schools in Grassfield, Deep Creek, and Millsville were consolidated in the 1950s and were housed in Central Elementary School on Shipyard Road.

In 1963, Deep Creek High School became part of the newly formed Chesapeake School System, which resulted from a merger of Norfolk County and the City of South Norfolk. In 1966, grades 7-8 were shifted from the high school to the junior high, which is now a defunct SECEP school. In 1979, due to large increases in enrollment at the high school and junior high school, the high school building on Deal Drive was redesignated a junior high school and a $7 million high school on Margaret Booker Drive was constructed to house grades 10-12.

The modern, efficient facility has been in use for more than thirty years. Academic classrooms, vocational training areas, corridors, gymnasium, media center, computer laboratory, and the commons area are well designed for the purposes they serve. The school was expanded in 1990 with a new wing serving the Math, Science and Foreign Language departments. The space was needed due to the addition of the ninth grade. In the summer of 1998, the school was expanded again to accommodate an enrollment of approximately 2,000 students. This new expansion includes improvements to the library, gymnasium, and classrooms for Science, Special Education, Art, and Vocational programs.

In 2011, Deep Creek High School was designated as a Science and Medicine Academy. Students from all over Chesapeake desiring to pursue a career in the medicine can apply. The four-year program is designed to allow students to begin gaining the knowledge needed to be successful in medical school. Students earn college credits and real-world experience in an array of science and medical subjects.

== Athletics and extracurricular activities ==
The mascot is a hornet and the sports teams currently play in the AAA Southeastern District of the AAA Eastern Region.

== State championships and appearances ==
- In the early-1980s, the school's girls' basketball team appeared in three consecutive state championship games, winning in 1982 (defeating Gar-Field High School, but losing the two following years, both times to W.T. Woodson High School.
- The wrestling team, Coached by David Olah, won the 1983 Virginia AAA State Team Championship, highlighting a golden era for the program that also included 8 Southeastern District titles and 2 Eastern Region titles.
- The football team dominated on both the local and state level throughout the entire 1990s, posting several undefeated regular seasons (1994, 1995, 1998, 1999, 2000), and forming a rivalry with Indian River High School and Western Branch High School. Deep Creek reached the state championship game in 1994 and 2000, losing to Patrick Henry High School of Ashland, VA and Centreville High School, respectively.

Deep Creek has been particularly known for their track and field program which has won state championships in 1995, 2001, 2002, 2003, 2005 and 2007.

Because of the building of Grassfield High School, many of the track stars have been rezoned and will now compete against Deep Creek High for state championships.

In 2004, the Men's Volleyball Team completed an undefeated regular season in the Southeastern District and advanced to the State Tournament for the first time in school history.

In 2015, the Ladies Varsity Softball Team won their second consecutive Conference 17 Championship as well as their first 4A South Regional Championship. They played in their first ever Virginia State Tournament. Unfortunately they fell in the semi-final round, finishing their best ever season with a 25-4 record.

== Notable alumni ==
- James Anderson - Chicago Bears linebacker and 88th overall pick in the 2006 NFL draft
- Deborah Coleman - blues musician
- Michael Copon - Hollywood Actor noted for Power Rangers and One Tree Hill
- Chris Crocker - Atlanta Falcons safety and 2003 20th pick Cleveland Browns
- Ras-I Dowling - New England Patriots cornerback 33rd pick overall in 2011 NFL draft
- Deon Dyer- Miami Dolphins running back in 2003-2004
- DeAngelo Hall - Washington Redskins player and 8th pick in the 2004 NFL draft
- Darren Perry - 1992 NFL draft by the Pittsburgh Steelers as a professional football player. Became an NFL coach for Pittsburgh Steelers and Green Bay Packers Oakland Raiders coach and former NFL player for 9 seasons
- Clay Rapada - Major League Baseball player
- Mike Scott - Philadelphia 76ers 43rd overall draft pick 2012 NBA draft
- Darryl Tapp - Washington Redskins player and 63rd pick overall in the 2006 NFL draft
