= VHSL Group 6A South Region =

High school sports league division in Virginia, USA

The Group 6A South Region is a division of the Virginia High School League. Along with the 6A North Region, it consists of the largest high schools in Virginia. The region was formed in 2013 when the VHSL adopted a six classification format and eliminated the previous three classification system. For the purpose of regular season competition, schools compete within districts that existed prior to 2013, while post-season competition will be organized within four conferences that make up each region.

== Conferences for 2013–14 and 2014–15 ==
=== Coastal Conference 1 ===
- Bayside High School of Virginia Beach
- First Colonial High School of Virginia Beach
- Frank W. Cox High School of Virginia Beach
- Landstown High School of Virginia Beach
- Ocean Lakes High School of Virginia Beach
- Tallwood High School of Virginia Beach
- Granby High School of Norfolk

=== Monitor Merrimac Conference 2 ===
- Bethel High School of Hampton
- Kecoughtan High School of Hampton
- Woodside High School of Newport News
- Grassfield High School of Chesapeake
- Oscar Smith High School of Chesapeake
- Western Branch High School of Chesapeake

=== Conference 3 ===
- Varina High School of Richmond
- Thomas Dale High School of Chester
- Cosby High School of Midlothian
- James River High School of Midlothian
- Franklin County High School of Rocky Mount
- Patrick Henry High School of Roanoke

=== Conference 4 ===
- Gar-Field High School of Woodbridge
- C. D. Hylton High School of Woodbridge
- Colonial Forge High School of Stafford
- Riverbend High School of Spotsylvania
- Freedom High School of Woodbridge
- Forest Park High School of Woodbridge
- Woodbridge Senior High School of Woodbridge.
