= Suffolk City Public Schools =

School district in Suffolk, Virginia, United States

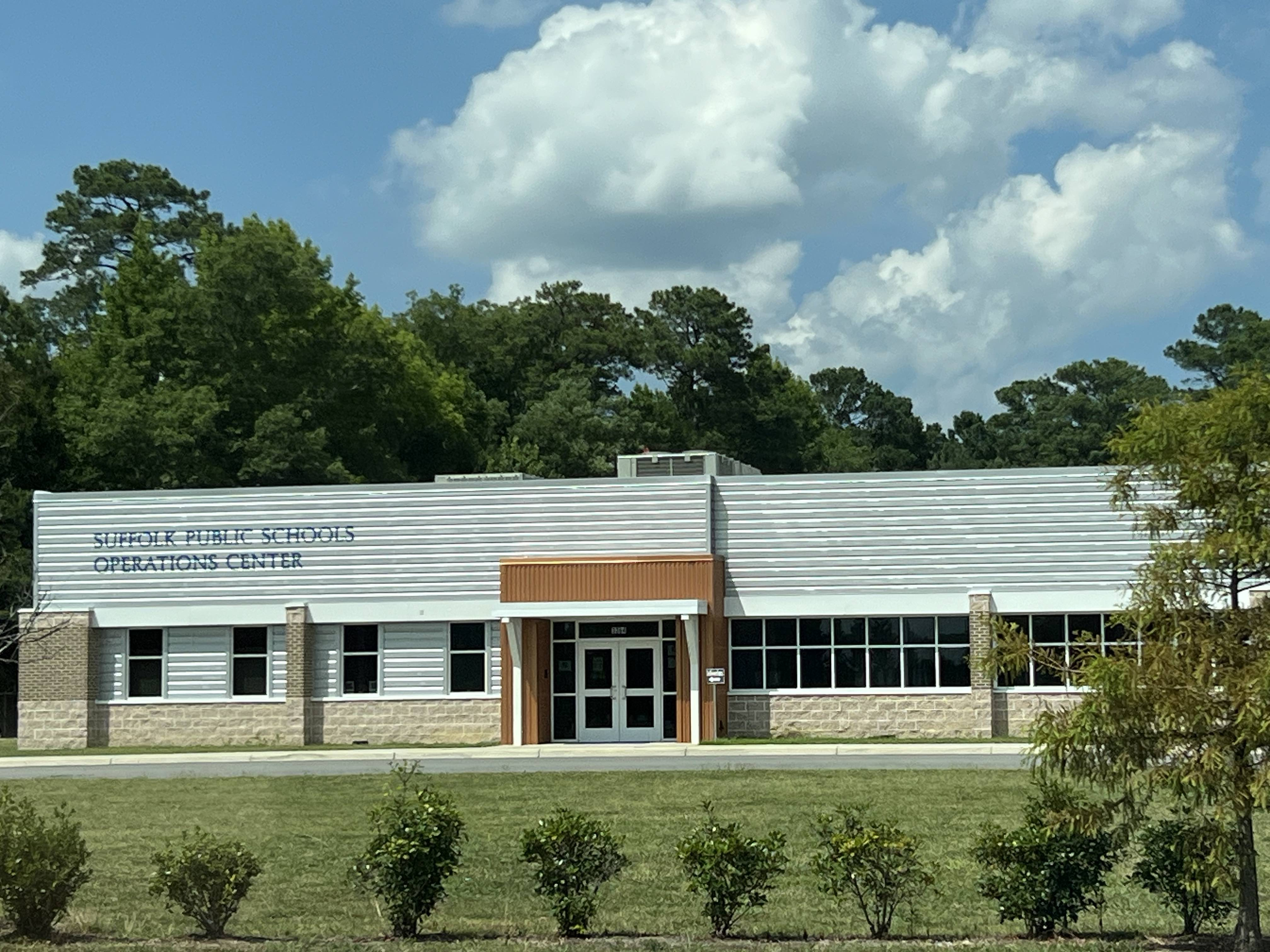
- Suffolk City Public Schools operations center on Pruden Boulevard

Address
- 100 N. Main St Suffolk, Virginia, 23434; United States
- Coordinates: 36°43′41″N 76°34′59″W

District information
- Type: Public
- Grades: Pre-K–12
- Superintendent: Dr. John B. Gordon III
- School board: Tyron D. Riddick, Chair (Suffolk Borough); Heather S. Howell, Vice Chair (Sleepy Hole Borough); Kimberly A. Slingluff (Chuckatuck Borough); Karen L. Jenkins, (Cypress Borough); Dr. Dawn Marie Brittingham, Ed.D. (Holy Neck Borough); Dr. Judith Brooks-Buck, (Nansemond Borough); Phyllis C. Byrum (Whaleyville Borough)
- NCES District ID: 5103710

Students and staff
- Enrollment: 13,869 (2020-2021)
- Staff: 1,838
- Student–teacher ratio: 14.15
- Athletic conference: Southeastern District; Eastern Region

Other information
- Website: www.spsk12.net

Suffolk Public Schools is the branch of the government of the city of Suffolk, Virginia responsible for public K-12 education. Suffolk has multiple advanced/honors through its high schools, such as International Baccalaureate at King's Fork, Project Lead the Way Engineering at Nansemond River, and Project Lead the Way Biomedical at Lakeland.

The Superintendent of Schools is Dr. John B. Gordon III. The Chief of Schools is Dr. Stenette Bryd, III and Chief Academic Officer is Dr. Okema Branch. The school system operates 11 elementary schools, five middle schools, three high schools, one alternative center and one College and Career Academy.

== Schools ==
=== Elementary schools ===
- Booker T. Washington Elementary School
- Creekside Elementary School
- Elephant's Fork Elementary School
- Florence Bowser Elementary School
- Hillpoint Elementary School
- Kilby Shores Elementary School
- Mack Benn, Jr. Elementary School
- Nansemond Parkway Elementary School
- Northern Shores Elementary School
- Oakland Elementary School
- Southwestern Elementary School

=== Middle schools ===
- Colonel Fred Cherry Middle School
- Forest Glen Middle School
- John F. Kennedy Middle School
- John Yeates Middle School
- King's Fork Middle School

=== High schools ===
- King's Fork High School
- Lakeland High School
- Nansemond River High School

=== Alternative Center ===
- College & Career Academy At Pruden
- Turlington Woods Alternative School

=== Former schools ===
- Thomas Jefferson Elementary School (1911–1990)
- Booker T. Washington High School (1913–1969)
- Florence Bowser Elementary School (1920–2016)
- Suffolk High School (1922–1990)
- Chuckatuck High School (1924–1965)
- East Suffolk Elementary School (1929–1979)
- East Suffolk High School (1938–1965)
- Nansemond County Training School (1924–1964)
- Southwestern High School (1964–1970)
- Chuckatuck Junior High School (1965–1977)
- John F. Kennedy High School (1965–1990)
- John Yeates High School (1965–1990)
- Forest Glen High School (1965–1990)
- Southwestern Elementary School (1970–2014)
- Driver Elementary School (1968–2018)
