= Darren Perry =

American football player and coach (born 1968)

Personal information
- Born: December 29, 1968 (age 57); Chesapeake, Virginia, U.S.
- Listed height: 5 ft 11 in (1.80 m)
- Listed weight: 200 lb (91 kg)

Career information
- High school: Deep Creek (Chesapeake, Virginia)
- College: Penn State
- NFL draft: 1992: 8th round, 203rd overall pick

Career history

Playing
- Pittsburgh Steelers (1992–1998); San Diego Chargers (1999)*; Baltimore Ravens (1999); New Orleans Saints (2000)
- * Offseason or practice squad member only

Coaching
- Cincinnati Bengals (2002) Safeties coach; Pittsburgh Steelers (2003) Assistant defensive backs coach; Pittsburgh Steelers (2004–2006) Defensive backs coach; Oakland Raiders (2007–2008) Defensive backs coach; Green Bay Packers (2009–2017) Safeties coach; Vegas Vipers (2023) Defensive backs coach

Awards and highlights
- 2× Super Bowl champion (both as coach) (XL, XLV); Second-team All-Pro (1994); PFWA All-Rookie Team (1992); First-team All-American (1991); 2× First-team All-East (1990, 1991)

Career NFL statistics
- Interceptions: 35
- Sacks: 2.5
- Touchdowns: 1
- Stats at Pro Football Reference

Darren Perry (born December 29, 1968) is an American former professional football player who was a safety in the National Football League (NFL). He played college football for the Penn State Nittany Lions from 1988 to 1991. After graduating, he was selected in the eighth round of the 1992 NFL draft by the Pittsburgh Steelers. He played in the NFL for eight seasons, seven with the Steelers, but also with the San Diego Chargers, Baltimore Ravens, and New Orleans Saints. Perry retired from playing in 2000.

Since retiring, Perry has served as a defensive backs and safeties coach at the professional level with the Cincinnati Bengals, Pittsburgh Steelers, Oakland Raiders, and Green Bay Packers and the Vegas Vipers of the XFL.

== Playing career ==
=== High school ===
Perry attended Deep Creek High School in Chesapeake, Virginia, where he played football, basketball and tennis. He played on both sides of the ball for the football team, and threw for 23 touchdowns and 2,790 yards as quarterback, adding another 14 touchdowns and 1,167 yards rushing. Perry played under Coach Jim Garrett. He was named an All-Star in the Southeastern District and made second team All State.

In 2007, Perry was recognized by the Deep Creek High School Alumni Association as one of the top Distinguished Notable Alumni.

=== College ===
Perry played as a free safety under Joe Paterno at Penn State. He was named a first-team All-American as a senior in 1991 by the Football Writers Association of America. Perry is tied for the second-most career interceptions at the school, with 15. His 299 interception return yards and three interceptions for touchdowns are school records. Perry had six interceptions in his senior year and returned two for touchdowns.

Perry appeared on the cover of the November 26, 1990, issue of Sports Illustrated following Penn State's defeat of top-ranked Notre Dame. Perry intercepted a pass late in the game that set up the game-winning field goal.

=== Professional ===
Pre-draft measurables
| Height | Weight | Arm length | Hand span | 40-yard dash | 10-yard split | 20-yard split | 20-yard shuttle | Vertical jump | Broad jump | Bench press |
|---|---|---|---|---|---|---|---|---|---|---|
| 5 ft 10 3/8 in (1.79 m) | 190 lb (86 kg) | 30 in (0.76 m) | 8 5/8 in (0.22 m) | 4.81 s | 1.69 s | 2.78 s | 4.36 s | 32.0 in (0.81 m) | 9 ft 5 in (2.87 m) | 13 reps |

An eighth-round draft pick (203rd overall) of the 1992 NFL draft, Perry was picked by Pittsburgh Steelers head coach Bill Cowher. Perry played seven seasons (1992–98) with the team. Largely unheralded, the free safety started from his first game as a rookie. That year, he picked off six passes, and became the first rookie since 1955 to lead the team in interceptions. Perry was named the winner of the 1992 Charles Edward Greene, aka the "Joe Greene" Great Performance Award, given to the most outstanding Steelers rookie. Perry is the only free safety to receive this award since it was established in 1984.

Perry started in each of the first 110 games of his career, including the postseason, all with the Steelers.

Perry was a member of the 1995 AFC Champion Steelers that nearly upset the heavily favored Dallas Cowboys in Super Bowl XXX. Pittsburgh won five division titles, an AFC title, and appeared in three AFC championship games during Perry's time on the team.

Perry played 64 games paired with Pro Bowler Rod Woodson in the secondary from 1992 to 1996. They combined for 48 interceptions over this period. Perry's 32 career interceptions from 1992 to 1998 are tied for seventh in Pittsburgh history.

Perry signed with the San Diego Chargers in 1999, but sat out the season with a neck injury. He played his final season in 2000 with the New Orleans Saints, starting all 16 regular season games and recording three interceptions.

Perry retired having played in 139 of 141 possible games. He missed only two games in 1997 due to a groin injury. He started 13 postseason games, including Super Bowl XXX. He had a career total of 35 interceptions, one interception returned for a touchdown, four forced fumbles, eight fumbles recovered, and two and a half sacks.

In 1997, the Pittsburgh Chapter of Pro Football Writers of America selected Perry as the recipient of "The Chief" Award, given annually to the Steeler who best exemplifies the spirit of cooperation with the media.

== Coaching ==
Perry spent the 2002 season as the Cincinnati Bengals' safeties coach under his former defensive coordinator, Dick LeBeau. He coached defensive backs for the Steelers from 2003 to 2006, and helped develop two outstanding Steelers safeties, All-Pro Troy Polamalu and Chris Hope. The Steelers won Super Bowl XL in 2005 while Perry was on staff. He resigned from the Steelers coaching staff after the retirement of head coach Bill Cowher.

The Oakland Raiders hired Perry as their defensive backs coach in 2007. He spent two seasons with the team and coached Pro Bowl player Nnamdi Asomugha.

The Green Bay Packers hired Perry as their safeties coach on February 3, 2009, and he remained on their staff through the 2017 season. He was secondary coach on the 2010 Packers squad that won Super Bowl XLV over the Steelers.

Perry was officially hired by the Vegas Vipers on September 13, 2022. On January 1, 2024, it was announced the Vipers would not be a part of the UFL Merger.

== Personal life ==
In 1992, Perry started a program called "Intercept for Care", where he made a $500 donation for every interception he made to Chesapeake Care—a free health clinic for those without insurance or access. Perry later convinced others to match his contributions, making each interception worth as much as $2,500.

Perry and his wife Errika have four children and live in Chesapeake, Virginia, in the offseason.

In 2007, Perry and Keith Goganious, a fellow Penn State and NFL player, helped revive the Hampton Roads Football Camp after a 12-year hiatus. The camp, held at Virginia Wesleyan College, is aimed at high school athletes. New York Giants wide receiver Plaxico Burress was a past attendee.

On August 27, 2022, Perry was given the 2021 Presidential Volunteer Lifetime of Achievement Award for his outstanding service to the community. He was also honored by the city of Chesapeake as The Chesapeake ICON 2022 Hometown Hero with a letter of recognition from the Office of the Mayor. Perry was nominated on August 30, 2022, to the Virginia Sports Hall of Fame.
