= Willie Rodgers =

American football player (1949–1998)

No. 34
- Position: Running back

Personal information
- Born: February 8, 1949; Suffolk, Virginia, U.S.
- Died: September 17, 1998 (aged 49); Houston, Texas, U.S.
- Listed height: 6 ft 0 in (1.83 m)
- Listed weight: 210 lb (95 kg)

Career information
- High school: John F. Kennedy (Suffolk)
- College: Kentucky State
- NFL draft: 1972: 12th round, 290th overall pick

Career history
- Houston Oilers (1972–1975)
- Stats at Pro Football Reference

Willie Daniel Rodgers Jr. (February 8, 1949 – September 17, 1998) was an American former professional football running back who played for the Houston Oilers of the National Football League (NFL). He played college football for the Kentucky State Thorobreds.
