= Kenny Easley =

American football player (1959–2025)

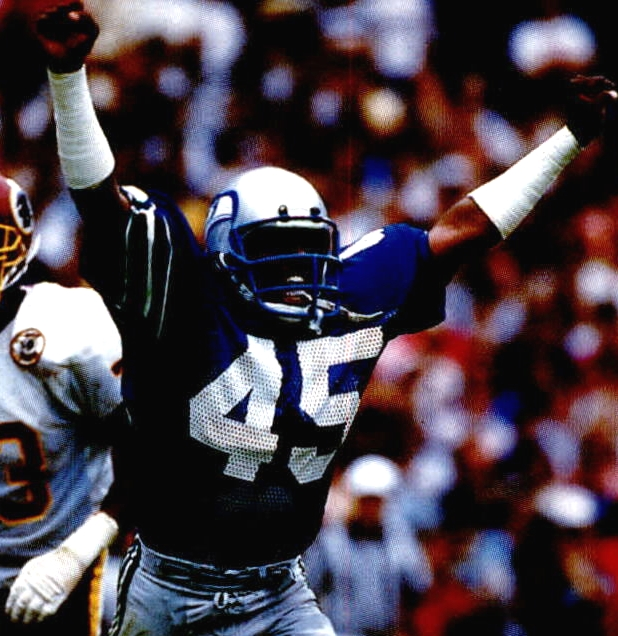
- Easley with the Seattle Seahawks in 1986

No. 45
- Position: Safety

Personal information
- Born: January 15, 1959; Chesapeake, Virginia, U.S.
- Died: November 14, 2025 (aged 66)
- Listed height: 6 ft 3 in (1.91 m)
- Listed weight: 206 lb (93 kg)

Career information
- High school: Oscar F. Smith (South Norfolk, Virginia)
- College: UCLA (1977–1980)
- NFL draft: 1981: 1st round, 4th overall pick

Career history
- Seattle Seahawks (1981–1987)

Awards and highlights
- NFL Defensive Player of the Year (1984); 4× First-team All-Pro (1982–1985); Second-team All-Pro (1987); 5× Pro Bowl (1982–1985, 1987); NFL interceptions leader (1984); PFWA All-Rookie Team (1981); NFL 1980s All-Decade Team; Seattle Seahawks 35th Anniversary team; Seattle Seahawks Top 50 players; Seattle Seahawks Ring of Honor; Seattle Seahawks No. 45 retired; 2× Unanimous All-American (1979, 1980); Consensus All-American (1978); 4× First-team All-Pac-10 (1977–1980); UCLA Bruins No. 5 retired

Career NFL statistics
- Interceptions: 32
- Interception yards: 538
- Fumble recoveries: 11
- Sacks: 8
- Defensive touchdowns: 3
- Stats at Pro Football Reference
- Pro Football Hall of Fame
- College Football Hall of Fame

Kenneth Mason Easley Jr. (January 15, 1959 – November 14, 2025) was an American professional football player who spent his entire seven-year career as a safety for the Seattle Seahawks of the National Football League (NFL) from 1981 to 1987. He played college football for the UCLA Bruins and was a three-time consensus All-American. He was selected by the Seahawks in the first round of the 1981 NFL draft. Nicknamed "the Enforcer", Easley has been considered among the greatest defensive backs of his era and as one of the Seahawks' greatest players.

Easley was a leader of the Seahawks' defense and was named the NFL Defensive Player of the Year in 1984. He was a four-time All-Pro selection and was elected to the Pro Bowl five times in his career. Easley's career ended after the 1987 season when he was diagnosed with severe kidney disease.

After retirement, Easley owned a Cadillac dealership and, later, the Norfolk Nighthawks team from 1999 to 2003. He was inducted into the Virginia Sports Hall of Fame in 1998 and was voted into the Pro Football Hall of Fame in 2017.

== Early life ==
Born on January 15, 1959, Kenny Easley was raised in Chesapeake, Virginia. He had sisters and his mother's name was Juanita. He graduated from its Oscar F. Smith High School in 1977. He was the first player in the history of Virginia high-school football to rush and pass for more than 1,000 yards in a single season, and was an all-state and All-American selection at quarterback. In 1996, Oscar F. Smith High School honored Easley and fellow graduates Ed Beard and Steve DeLong by naming its football stadium Beard-DeLong-Easley Field on September 6.

== College career ==
Recruited by as many as 350 colleges, Easley selected the University of California, Los Angeles (UCLA) and played for the Bruins football team. He started ten games as a true freshman in 1977, recording nine interceptions and was named to his first All-Pac-10 squad. His 93 tackles established a school record for tackles by a true freshman. He later became the first player in conference history to be honored as all-conference for four consecutive years. Playing from 1977 to 1980, Easley finished his college career with a school-record 19 interceptions and 374 tackles, along with 45 punt returns for 454 yards.

Easley was a three-time consensus All-American selection (1978, 1979, 1980) and finished ninth in the Heisman Trophy balloting in 1980, when he recorded 105 tackles as a senior. He also played basketball at the junior-varsity level for UCLA and was selected by the Chicago Bulls in the tenth round of the 1981 NBA draft, but he did not play professionally.

== Professional career ==
Easley was the fourth overall pick of the 1981 NFL draft, selected by the Seattle Seahawks. He became an immediate starter as a rookie in 1981, recording three interceptions for 155 yards and one touchdown, earning him AFC Defensive Rookie of the Year honors. In 1983, the Seahawks hired former Buffalo Bills coach Chuck Knox as their head coach and Easley immediately became the "backbone" of Knox's defense. In his first season playing for Knox, Easley won the AFC Defensive Player of the Year Award and recorded seven interceptions. In 1984, Easley led the NFL in interceptions with ten, which tied a club record. He returned two of them for touchdowns and was named as the NFL Defensive Player of the Year, the first safety awarded since Dick Anderson in 1973. In 1984, during a 45–0 win over the Kansas City Chiefs in the Kingdome on November 4, the Seahawks returned four interceptions for touchdowns, including one caught by Easley, breaking the record for most touchdowns scored from an interception in a game. He took over the role of the team's main punt returner when Paul Johns got injured earlier in the season.

After the season, Easley signed a five-year contract to stay with the Seahawks, averaging $650,000 a year plus incentives. The contract made him one of the highest paid defensive players in the league. In 1985, he was selected for his fourth consecutive Pro Bowl, a team record until defensive tackle Cortez Kennedy was selected for his fifth consecutive Pro Bowl in 1995. He was injured for most of the 1986 season; he hurt his knee against the San Diego Chargers on October 11, and the next month, missed the remainder of the season due to ankle surgery. In December, Easley was rumored to be in the trading block as the Seahawks were attempting to get the first overall pick in the 1987 NFL draft from the Tampa Bay Buccaneers, in order to draft quarterback Vinny Testaverde.

In 1987, Easley was the Seahawks' player representative and a leading figure in the 1987 NFL strike. Seeking a new collective-bargaining agreement with free agency a major factor, the head of the National Football League Players Association, Gene Upshaw managed to convince him and hundreds of his fellow NFL players to go on strike. As a response, the league decided to use replacement players to fill up their rosters, along with a few veterans who crossed the "picket line". When former teammate Jim Zorn offered his services to the Seahawks, Easley said:

He obviously is either desperate to play in the NFL or desperate for money. Here's a guy who played in the NFL for a long time and who was adored and was admired by his fans and teammates. Now, he turns his back on us.

Easley warned his fellow players that he was against the idea of using violence against the replacement players to prove a point. Once the strike ended, he had an off-year as the Seahawks passing defense fell to 25th in the league. His last game was a 23–20 overtime loss to the Houston Oilers in the wild card game of the 1987 NFL playoffs.

=== Trade and retirement ===
Prior to the 1988 season, the Seahawks offered Easley to several clubs in an attempt to get a quarterback in return. His declining play, which was partially blamed on his work during the strike and the blossoming of Easley's backup Paul Moyer, had made Easley expendable. On April 22, 1988, the Seahawks traded him to the Phoenix Cardinals for quarterback Kelly Stouffer. During the mandatory team physical, Easley was diagnosed with idiopathic nephrotic syndrome, a severe kidney disease which voided the trade. He had told Moyer that he thought his days with the Seahawks were numbered because of his involvement in the player's strike. He was not surprised when the trade happened but the kidney diagnosis had "shocked" him. The Seahawks offered several draft picks as compensation to the Cardinals to complete the trade and Easley announced his retirement a few months later.

Easley filed a lawsuit against the Seahawks, and the team doctors saying that an overdose of Advil (ibuprofen) for an ankle injury a few years before was the cause of his kidney failure. He knew as early as 1986 that there were issues with his kidney but finally realized the severity of it when he did not pass the Cardinals physical. He said that he took 15 to 20 Advils daily for three months to reduce the swelling in his ankle, before a doctor intervened and told him to stop. A former teammate said that Advil and other medications were easily obtainable in the Seahawks locker room in "large dispensers" without proper medical supervision. Easley's physicians said that they never told him to take the quantity of Advils that Easley said he took. His case made national headlines and formed discussion involving the safe use of over the counter medication like Advil. The lawsuit was settled out of court in 1990.

Easley received a new kidney at the University of Washington Medical Center in Seattle, in June 1990.

== Later life ==
In 1991, Easley bought into a car dealership (along with his partner Rick Johnson), Alderwood Oldsmobile & Cadillac in Lynnwood, Washington, (it later moved to Shoreline, Washington in 1996), taking advantage of a General Motors program that made it easier for African-Americans and other minorities to own an auto dealership. The dealership became successful and Easley was named president of the African American Dealers Association.

In 1999, Easley, along with Buffalo Bills defensive end Bruce Smith, were named as the new owners of the Norfolk Nighthawks of the AF2, a semi-professional arena football league branched out from the Arena Football League. The day after the city announced Easley and Smith as owners, a controversy arose with Mark Garcea and Page Johnson, the owners of the Hampton Roads Admirals minor league hockey team, and the city of Norfolk, Virginia. Garcea and Johnson stated that they participated in the original AF2 meetings and asked the city for exclusive rights to own the franchise, providing a $5,000 down payment. Instead, the city allowed Easley and Smith to pay the league's $75,000 franchise fee. The AF2 started playing their first games in the summer of 2000. In his first season as owner, the Nighthawks averaged 6,500 fans at their home field per game, and sold 3,200 season tickets. The team made the AF2 playoffs, but lost money in their first season, which Easley blamed as "rookie mistakes" and startup costs. The team disbanded prior to the 2004 season.

=== Reconciliation with the Seahawks ===
After his retirement, Easley cut most of his ties with the Seahawks organization, citing the lawsuit, how his "dignity" was affected by the Stouffer trade and how no one from the organization offered condolences after his kidney transplant. In 2002, he received a phone call from Gary Wright, the Seahawks publicity director, saying that Paul Allen, the new owner, wanted to induct Easley into the Ring of Honor, and that no other players would receive the honor again until he accepted. With the team under a different owner than that for whom Easley had played, Easley viewed the invitation as an opportunity to reconcile and reconnect with the Seahawks organization. He accepted the honor and became the seventh Seahawk to be inducted into the team Ring of Honor in 2002. For the remainder of his life, he enjoyed cordial relations with the organization.

Easley was named an honorary captain during Super Bowl XLIX, flipping the coin while Vince Wilfork called the toss on behalf of the captains. The Seahawks officially retired Easley's number 45 in 2017.

== Legacy ==
In his seven-year NFL career, Easley recorded 32 interceptions for 538 yards and three touchdowns, while also returning 27 punts for 302 yards. In 2002, he was elected to the Seattle Seahawks Ring of Honor after several attempts by the Seahawks to nominate him, but he was previously not interested. Easley was also named to the NFL 1980s All-Decade Team. In 2012, the Professional Football Researchers Association named him to the PRFA Hall of Very Good Class of 2012.

In 2016, Easley was named the senior finalist for the Pro Football Hall of Fame's 2017 class, he was elected in February 2017, and his bust was sculpted by Scott Myers.

Easley's No. 5 jersey was retired by UCLA in 1981, the year after his final season with the Bruins. He was elected to the UCLA Athletics Hall of Fame and the College Football Hall of Fame in 1991.

== Personal life and death ==
Easley and his wife, Gail, had three children: Kendrick, Gabrielle, and Giordanna.

Easley died on November 14, 2025, at the age of 66.
