= Ciara Sivels =

American nuclear engineer

- Education: Massachusetts Institute of Technology, University of Michigan
- Awards: American Association for the Advancement of Science IF/THEN Ambassador
- Scientific career
- Fields: Nuclear engineering, nuclear physics
- Workplaces: Johns Hopkins Applied Physics Laboratory
- Thesis: Development of an Advanced Radioxenon Detector for Nuclear Explosion Monitoring (2018)

Ciara Sivels (born 1990) is an American nuclear engineer at the Johns Hopkins Applied Physics Laboratory. She was the first black woman to earn a Ph.D. in nuclear engineering from the University of Michigan. She was named an IF/THEN Ambassador in 2019 by the American Association for the Advancement of Science.

== Early life and education ==
Sivels is from Chesapeake, Virginia. She attended Hickory High School. Sivels was originally interested in culinary arts, but took an Advanced Placement class in chemistry and became interested in science. She completed her undergraduate studies at Massachusetts Institute of Technology, During her time at MIT, Sivels interned for Teach For America before considering a career in academic research. She also served in various leadership roles at the MIT chapter of the National Society of Black Engineers.

Sivels joined the University of Michigan (UoM) in 2013 for her graduate studies, working on Beta-Gamma coincidence-detectors and nuclear forensics with Sara Pozzi. Her thesis considered nuclear nonproliferation using radioxenon for nuclear explosion monitoring in collaboration with the Pacific Northwest National Laboratory. She developed a new "plug and play" radioxenon detector device to improve monitoring at. She received the first Place Poster Award US Department of Energy National Nuclear Security Administration University and Industry Technical Interchange in 2016.

During her graduate studies, Sivels was one of three black women completing their PhD. She engaged with the Detroit Pre-College Engineering Program, supporting high school students from minority backgrounds. She also founded the Women in Nuclear Engineering in Radiological Sciences group at UoM. In 2018, Sivels was the first black woman to earn a PhD in nuclear engineering at the University of Michigan, considered the top nuclear engineering program in the United States.

== Research ==
Sivels currently works at the Johns Hopkins Applied Physics Laboratory and her work, funded through the Department of Defense, is highly classified. Sivels is a member of the National Society of Black Engineers.

== Awards and honors ==
In 2019, Sivels was chosen to be one of the 125 national American Association for the Advancement of Science IF/THEN Ambassadors. The award recognizes the work of women in science, technology, engineer and mathematics fields as part of an outreach initiative to encourage the representation of women in STEM fields. Subsequently, a 3D printed statue of Sivels was displayed on the Smithsonian National Mall in March 2022 as part of Women's History Month. She was named a "Millennial to Watch" by the US Office of Nuclear Energy in 2019.

Sivels was featured on a GoldieBlox episode "Draw Her Life" empowering girls in STEM fields.
