= Ed Beard (American football) =

American football player and coach (1939–2023)

No. 50
- Position: Linebacker

Personal information
- Born: December 9, 1939; Fredericksburg, Virginia, U.S.
- Died: January 15, 2023 (aged 83)
- Listed height: 6 ft 1 in (1.85 m)
- Listed weight: 226 lb (103 kg)

Career information
- High school: Oscar Smith (Chesapeake, Virginia)
- College: Tennessee
- NFL draft: 1964: 14th round, 183rd overall pick
- AFL draft: 1964: 20th round, 159th overall pick

Career history

Playing
- San Francisco 49ers (1965–1972)

Coaching
- San Francisco 49ers (1973–1977) Linebackers coach; New Orleans Saints (1978–1979) Linebackers coach; New Orleans Saints (1980) Defensive coordinator; Detroit Lions (1983–1984) Defensive coordinator

Career NFL statistics
- Interceptions: 3
- Fumble recoveries: 3
- Sacks: 3.5
- Stats at Pro Football Reference
- Coaching profile at Pro Football Reference

Edward Leroy Beard (December 9, 1939 – January 15, 2023) was an American professional football player.

== Early life and education ==
Beard was born in Chesapeake, Virginia, on December 9, 1939. A 1959 graduate of Oscar F. Smith High School in South Norfolk, Virginia, Beard was an All-American and also State Heavyweight Wrestling Champion in 1957 when his high school, Oscar F. Smith, did not have a wrestling team; the only time this has ever been accomplished by a wrestler. In 1960, Beard completed his postgraduate year at the Staunton Military Academy, where he was a standout football player. Beard played two years of college football at Tennessee before joining the Army, where he was selected Outstanding Player on the Army football team.

== National Football League ==
Drafted by the San Francisco 49ers in 1964, Beard was a special teams captain and middle linebacker; during his eight years with the team, San Francisco won the NFC West three years in a row. Beard won the Len Eshmont Award in 1971 and was the first special teams captain in NFL history. After his career was cut short by injuries, Beard served as linebackers coach for the 49ers and New Orleans Saints, and later became defensive coordinator for the Detroit Lions.

== After the NFL ==
In 1996 the football field at Oscar Smith was renamed Beard-DeLong-Easley Field in honor of Beard and fellow alumni Steve DeLong and Kenny Easley. In 2002 Beard was inducted into the Virginia Sports Hall of Fame. He was honored along with other former 49ers on November 5, 2006, at an Alumni Day. After leaving football, Beard entered the contracting business and helped promote country music in the greater Hampton Roads area. On October 23, 2011, Beard was riding his bicycle in the north section of Chesapeake, Virginia, and saw a person being beaten by about 15-20 teenagers. He stopped to help the victim but was attacked by the group of youths and suffered a concussion, cuts, and bruises. Beard stated he would continue working with youth groups, something he had done for several years. As of March 2013, four of those involved had been sentenced to jail time. Beard stated he hoped this would help them turn their lives around.

Beard died on January 15, 2023, at the age of 83.
