= Chesapeake City Public Schools =

School district in Virginia, United States

Chesapeake Public Schools (CPS), also known as Chesapeake City Public Schools, is the school division that administers public education in the United States city of Chesapeake, Virginia. The superintendent is Dr. Doug Brubaker.

== History ==
In 2004, the school board revealed a building plan that stated that the renovations needed to the schools would total $500,000.

== Schools ==
High schools

- Deep Creek High School
- Grassfield High School
- Great Bridge High School
- Hickory High School
- Indian River High School
- Oscar Smith High School
- Western Branch High School

Middle schools

- Crestwood Middle School
- Deep Creek Middle School
- Great Bridge Middle School
- Greenbrier Middle School
- Hickory Middle School
  - As of 2004 the official capacity is 1,500, but the school had 1,871. To deal with the overcrowding the school had 26 portable classrooms.
- Indian River Middle School
- Jolliff Middle School
- Hugo Owens Middle School
- Oscar Smith Middle School
  - In 2004 Matthew Bowers of The Virginian Pilot wrote that the building's condition was deteriorating and that compared to Hickory Middle, "is even more crowded".
- Western Branch Middle School

Elementary schools

- B. M. Williams Elementary
- Butts Road Intermediate
- Butts Road Primary School
- Camelot Elementary School
- Carver Elementary School
- Cedar Road Elementary
- Chittum Elementary School
- Crestwood Elementary
- Deep Creek Central Elementary
- Deep Creek Elementary
- Georgetown Primary
- Grassfield Elementary School
- Great Bridge Intermediate
- Great Bridge Primary School
- Greenbrier Intermediate
- Greenbrier Primary School
- Hickory Elementary School
- Norfolk Highlands Primary
- Portlock Primary School
- Rena B. Wright Primary
- Southeastern Elementary
- Southwestern Elementary
- Sparrow Road Intermediate
- Thurgood Marshall Elementary
- Treakle Elementary School
- Truitt Intermediate
- Western Branch Intermediate
- Western Branch Primary
