= Andrew Brown (American football) =

American football player (born 1995)

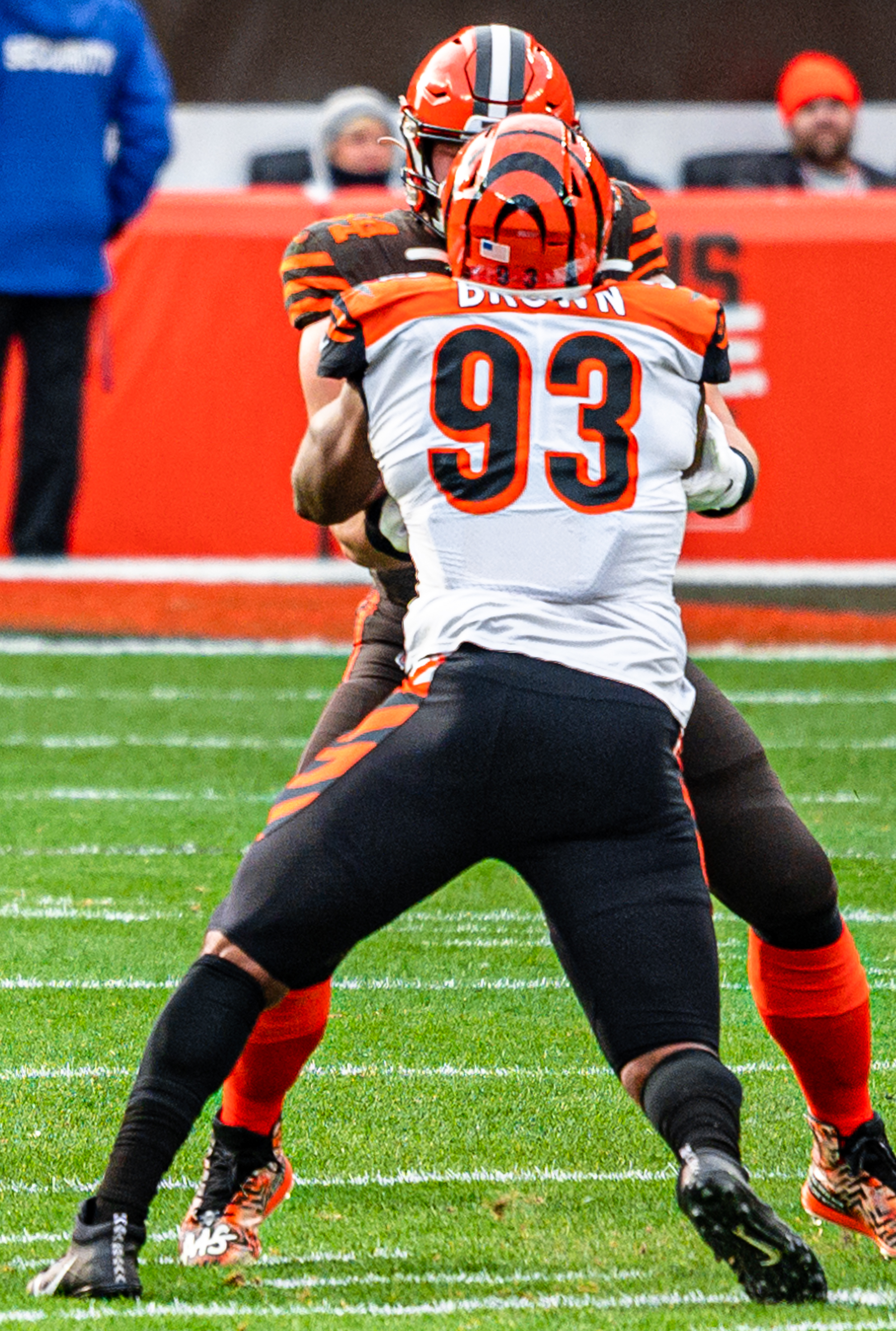
- Brown with the Cincinnati Bengals in 2019

Profile
- Position: Defensive tackle

Personal information
- Born: December 30, 1995 (age 30); Chesapeake, Virginia, U.S.
- Listed height: 6 ft 3 in (1.91 m)
- Listed weight: 290 lb (132 kg)

Career information
- High school: Oscar F. Smith (Chesapeake, Virginia)
- College: Virginia (2014–2017)
- NFL draft: 2018: 5th round, 158th overall pick

Career history
- Cincinnati Bengals (2018–2020); Houston Texans (2020); Indianapolis Colts (2021)*; Tennessee Titans (2021)*; Los Angeles Chargers (2021–2022)*; Arizona Cardinals (2022)*; Chicago Bears (2022); Buffalo Bills (2023)*
- * Offseason or practice squad member only

Career NFL statistics
- Total tackles: 19
- Sacks: 1
- Stats at Pro Football Reference

Andrew Brown (born December 30, 1995) is an American professional football defensive tackle. He played college football for the Virginia Cavaliers. Brown was a two-time high school All-American at Oscar F. Smith High School in Chesapeake, Virginia. He has been a member of the Cincinnati Bengals, Houston Texans, Indianapolis Colts, Tennessee Titans, Los Angeles Chargers, Arizona Cardinals, Chicago Bears and Buffalo Bills.

== Early life ==
A native of Chesapeake, Virginia, Brown initially attended Indian River High School for his freshman and sophomore year. He transferred to Oscar Smith his junior year. At Oscar Smith, Brown further developed into one of the most sought-after prospects in the country. After posting 83 tackles and 11 sacks in 2012, he was named a first-team All-American by USA Today, a rare feat for a junior.

In his senior year, Brown recorded 93 tackles, 30 for a loss, 18 sacks and forced nine fumbles. Oscar Smith went undefeated into the 2013 VHSL 6A state championship game, where they were upset by Centreville High School 35–6. Brown repeated as USA Today All-American and also was named the Gatorade High School Football Player of the Year in 2013.

Regarded as a five-star recruit, Brown was ranked as the number one defensive tackle in his class. He committed to the University of Virginia.

== College career ==
Brown played for the Cavaliers from 2014 through 2017. During the 2017 season, he played in the Military Bowl and was invited to the 2018 Senior Bowl.

== Professional career ==
Pre-draft measurables
Height	Weight	Arm length	Hand span	Wingspan	40-yard dash	10-yard split	20-yard split	20-yard shuttle	Three-cone drill	Vertical jump	Broad jump	Bench press
6 ft 3 3/8 in (1.91 m)	296 lb (134 kg)	34 1/2 in (0.88 m)	9 3/8 in (0.24 m)	6 ft 9 1/2 in (2.07 m)	4.98 s	1.67 s	2.88 s	4.48 s	7.51 s	28.0 in (0.71 m)	8 ft 5 in (2.57 m)	31 reps
All values from NFL Combine/Pro Day

=== Cincinnati Bengals ===
Brown was selected by the Cincinnati Bengals in the fifth round, 158th overall, of the 2018 NFL draft. He was waived on September 1, 2018, and signed to the practice squad the next day. He signed a reserve/future contract with the Bengals on January 2, 2019.

In Week 4 of the 2020 season, against the Jacksonville Jaguars, Brown recorded his first career sack on Gardner Minshew during their 33–25 win. He was waived on October 19, 2020, and re-signed to the practice squad two days later.

=== Houston Texans ===
On November 25, 2020, Brown was signed off the Bengals' practice squad by the Houston Texans. He was waived on March 16, 2021.

=== Indianapolis Colts ===
Brown was claimed off waivers by the Indianapolis Colts on March 17, 2021. He was waived on August 31 and re-signed to the practice squad the next day. He was released on September 7.

=== Tennessee Titans ===
On September 22, 2021, Brown signed with the Tennessee Titans' practice squad. He was released on September 28.

=== Los Angeles Chargers ===
On October 5, 2021, Brown was signed to the Los Angeles Chargers practice squad. He signed a reserve/future contract with the Chargers on January 11, 2022.

On August 30, 2022, Brown was waived by the Chargers.

=== Arizona Cardinals ===
On September 2, 2022, Brown was signed to the Arizona Cardinals practice squad.

=== Chicago Bears ===
On November 30, 2022, Brown was signed by the Chicago Bears off the Cardinals practice squad. He was released on August 29, 2023.

=== Buffalo Bills ===
On October 11, 2023, Brown signed with the Buffalo Bills practice squad. He was not signed to a reserve/future contract after the season and thus became a free agent when his practice squad contract expired.
