= Lataisia Jones =

American neuroscientist

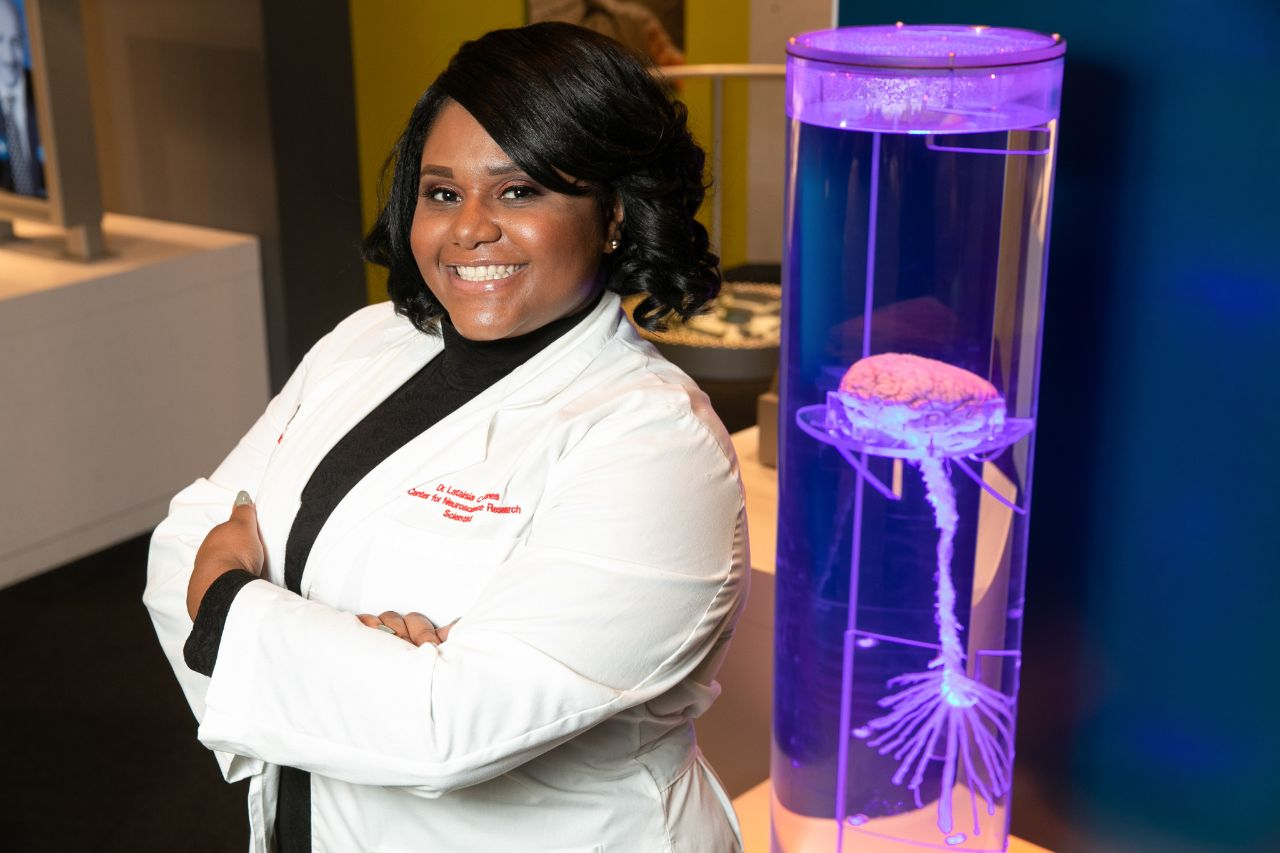
- Lataisia Jones, June 5, 2020
- Born: Suffolk, Virginia, U.S.
- Education: Virginia State University; Florida State University (PhD)
- Known for: First African American to graduate with a PhD from the Department of Biomedical Sciences in the College of Medicine at FSU
- Awards: 2019 AAAS IF/THEN Ambassador
- Scientific career
- Fields: Neuroscience
- Workplaces: NIH (NINDS)

Lataisia Jones is an African American neuroscientist in Washington, D.C. at the National Institutes of Health. Jones was the first African American to graduate with a Ph.D. from the Department of Biomedical Sciences located within the College of Medicine at Florida State University (FSU). Jones has spent her career studying neurological disorders through molecular and systems biology, and doing outreach and mentoring underrepresented minorities to inspire them to pursue careers in science, technology, engineering, and math (STEM) fields. Jones is the Scientific Research Officer (SRO) in the Scientific Review Branch (SRB) at the National Institute of Neurological Disorders and Stroke (NINDS).

== Early life and education ==
Jones is a Suffolk, Virginia native who attended Nansemond River High School and later graduated from King's Fork High School in 2006. She then attended Virginia State University (VSU) which is an HBCU located in Petersburg, Virginia. During her undergraduate studies, she explored her first research project within an internship at the College of William and Mary. The project was titled "Genetic Analysis of a Cell Cycle Exit Mutation in Caenorhabditis elegans" under the guidance of Professor Diane Shakes. Jones then completed a master's degree at VSU under the guidance of Professor Glenn Harris while taking a systems biology approach to study Non-Insulin Dependent Diabetes Mellitus in mice in a project titled "Association between Genetic Variants and Inherited Multi-factorial Diseases". In addition, Jones also taught introductory biology courses to undergraduates. Towards the end of her master's program, she traveled to Ghana, where her mother's side of the family originated, and taught English, math, and science to young students. It was the excitement of the kids she was teaching that inspired her to pursue a Ph.D., so that she could continue to teach while creating opportunities for students to study-abroad.

Jones pursued her doctoral degree within the Department of Biomedical Sciences which is located in the College of Medicine at Florida State University. She was the first African American to earn a PhD from the Department of Biomedical Sciences at FSU, and the first member of her family to earn a PhD. During her doctoral studies, Jones worked under the guidance of Dr. Pradeep Bhide and Deirdre McCarthy where she completed a dissertation titled "Elucidating the Molecular Etiology of Levodopa Responsive Dystonia" and published a manuscript characterizing the "Translational Effects and Coding Potential of an Upstream Open Reading Frame Associated with DOPA Responsive Dystonia (DRD)". Her research investigated the cellular consequences of the single nucleotide polymorphism (SNP) +142C>T, which introduces an upstream open reading frame (uORF) within the GCH1 gene and also represses GCH1 translation, which is involved in dopamine biosynthesis. The uORF encodes a 73-amino acid peptide, which after protease inhibition disrupts cell viability in the nucleus. This uORF and the +142C>T SNP are associated with a familial form of DOPA Responsive Dystonia, which is a neurological movement disorder that causes involuntary muscle contractions. Jones' research resulted in the generation of an antibody capable of detecting the mutant peptide within human cells; thus improving diagnosis and providing a blueprint for similar research.

== Career and research ==
After earning her Ph.D., Jones worked as a postdoctoral research fellow at Children's National Hospital in Washington, D.C., in the lab of Masaaki Torii studying brain development in children. Specifically, she researched the corpus callosum, which is responsible for the transmission of information between the left and right brain hemispheres. Jones took on two different research projects: studying Plexin-A1 during the postnatal development of the corpus callosum and how Tsc1 impacts lateral dispersion of cortical neurons impacted by Tuberous Sclerosis Complex I. Jones utilized the Green Fluorescent Protein (GFP) by injecting it into the neurons that travel through the corpus callosum, and observed the level of fluorescence to determine the amount of GFP absorbed in neurons and observing the fluorescent fibers within the corpus callosum. Jones performed experiments like in utero electroporation, microscopy and immunofluorescence to understand how the two sides of the brain communicate in order to find treatments for children with seizures, cognitive defects, and autism.

Jones has been selected as an IF/THEN Ambassador by the American Association for the Advancement of Science (AAAS), the largest general scientific society in the world, which is a role that serves to inspire young girls and women to pursue a future in STEM. In the future, Jones is committed to continue mentoring young students and creating study abroad opportunities throughout her career. Currently, Jones is an Ethics Fellow at the American Society for Microbiology.

== Advocacy ==
Jones was involved in mentoring as a teaching assistant during her undergraduate studies, a course instructor for an introductory biology course during her Master's program, and a research instructor for laboratory classes while pursuing her doctoral degree. As a graduate student, Jones traveled to Ghana to teach English, math, and science to young students and taught young students of underrepresented minorities in Tallahassee, Florida, within the Young Carver STEM Academy. Jones also volunteered her time as a mentor in the Girls 2 Divas Mentoring Program and as a weekly volunteer at the Ronald McDonald House in Washington, D.C. Jones initiated an outreach program called "Young Scientist Wednesdays" which allows her to teach patients at Children's National Hospital science through hands on activities, and also through her YouTube channel "Hey Dr. Tay". Most recently, through selection as an AAAS IF/THEN ambassador, Jones mentors middle school students to inspire young women to pursue STEM careers, and has also received training in communication and storytelling to help improve her advocacy efforts. In January 2020, Jones appeared on the CBS TV show "Mission Unstoppable" hosted by Miranda Cosgrove, which showcases trailblazers in STEM fields and is co-produced by Litton Entertainment and the Geena Davis Institute on Gender in Media. Jones is dedicated to providing a role model to young girls in underrepresented minority groups, as she recognizes the importance of having a mentor that looks like you and has gone through similar experiences as you.

== Awards and honor ==
- Center for Research, Education, and Training Enhancement Award (2016)
- Graduate Student Leadership Award (2016)
- Life Science's Symposium People's Choice Poster Award (2016)
- FSU Academic Leadership Award (2017)
- AAAS IF/THEN Ambassador (2019)

== Selected publications and presentations ==
- Jones L, Goode L, Davila E, et al. Translational effects and coding potential of an upstream open reading frame associated with DOPA Responsive Dystonia. Biochim Biophys Acta Mol Basis Dis. 2017;1863(6):1171‐1182. doi:10.1016/j.bbadis.2017.03.024.
- Jones, L.C., Son, A., Hashimoto-Torii, K., Torii, M. Role of Plexin-A1 in Postnatal Development of Corpus Callosum. Oral. Center for Neuroscience Research. Washington, D.C. November 2018.
- Jones, L., Davila, E., Goode, L., Bhide, P.G., Armata, I. Functional characterization of the upstream start codon in the GCH1 gene. Poster. The MDS 20th International Congress of Parkinson's Disease and Movement Disorders. Berlin, Germany. June 2016.
- Jones, L., Davila, E., Goode, L., Bhide, P.G., Armata, I. Overriding upstream reading frames associated with L-dopa responsive dystonia and other human diseases. Poster. Society for Neuroscience Conference, Chicago, IL. October 2015.
