= King's Fork High School =

Public high school in Virginia, US

Coordinates: 36°47′4.3″N 76°35′34.2″W

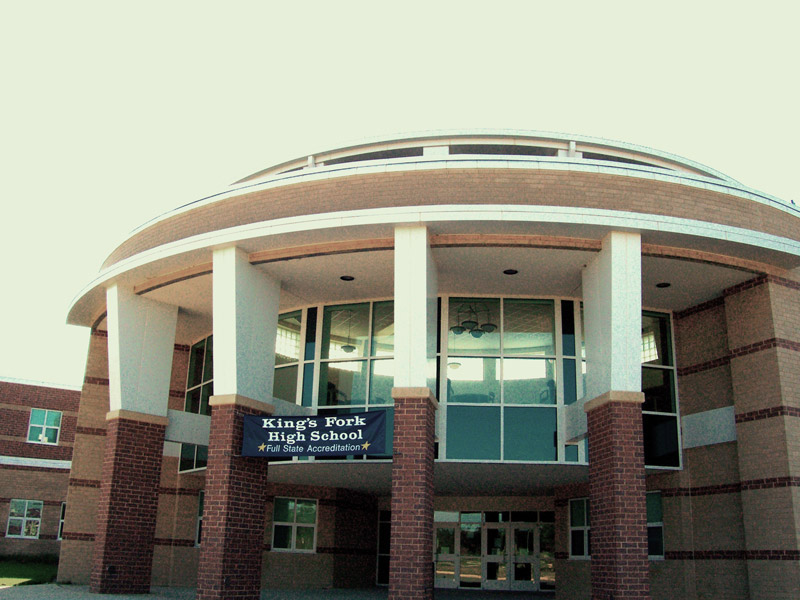

Location
- 351 Kings Fork Road; Suffolk, Virginia 23434; United States

Information
- School type: Public, high school
- Founded: 2003
- School district: Suffolk City Public Schools
- Superintendent: John B Gordon, III
- Principal: Derrick Bryant
- Grades: 9–12
- Enrollment: 1,666 (2023–24)
- Language: English
- Campus: Suburban
- Colors: Maroon and Vegas Gold ██
- Athletics conference: Class 5 Region B Southeastern District
- Mascot: Bulldogs
- Rival: Lakeland High School; Nansemond River High School
- Feeder schools: King's Fork Middle School; John F. Kennedy Middle School
- Website: Official Site

King's Fork High School is located in Suffolk, Virginia. It is administered by Suffolk City Public Schools. The school colors are maroon and Vegas gold, and the official mascot is the Bulldog.

King's Fork was founded in 2003, and was designed by the architectural firm of Ripley Rodriguez Maddox Motley. It was commissioned by Suffolk City Public Schools due to a widespread economic expansion in sprawl in the western Hampton Roads area.

Due to rezoning, students at King's Fork High are drawn from the Northwestern quadrants of the city, including the King's Fork area, Crittenden, and Hobson. Students are also drawn from the southern Nansemond Parkway/Wilroy Road area, and shares Downtown neighborhoods with Lakeland High School.

== Curriculum ==
King's Fork High School offers an extensive range of courses at core, honors, and Advanced Placement levels, in addition to various dual enrollment classes offered through the Hobbs campus of Paul D. Camp Community College, also located in Suffolk, and through Tidewater Community College. In addition to academic courses, King's Fork High offers a range of agricultural and resource management courses.

Due to the nature of student interests at the school, only certain core subjects are offered at the AP level at King's Fork, and the arts department often has too few students for courses in music theory or other such classes. However, beginning in the 2008–2009 school year, King's Fork began offering courses beginning at the freshman level through the IB (International Baccalaureate) program, in addition to its current curriculum.

== Sports ==
Fall Athletics		Boys & Girls Team
Girls	Cheerleading, Cross Country, JV & Varsity Field Hockey, Varsity Volleyball	
Boys	Golf, JV Football, Varsity Volleyball, Cross Country	
Winter Athletics		
Girls	Indoor Track, JV & Varsity Basketball	Swimming
Boys	Indoor Track, JV & Varsity Basketball, JV & Varsity Wrestling	Swimming
Spring Athletics		
Girls	JV & Varsity Soccer, JV & Varsity Softball, Outdoor Track, Tennis	
Boys	JV & Varsity Baseball, JV & Varsity Soccer, Outdoor Track, Tennis	

- In 2023, the Bulldogs’ women’s basketball team won its first Class 4 state championship, defeating Millbrook High School 71–67.
- In 2009, the King’s Fork men’s basketball team won its first state championship, defeating William Fleming High School 49–47.
- The Bulldogs’ men’s basketball team later won another state championship in 2020.

== Notable alumni ==
- Chuck Clark – NFL safety
- Davante Gardner – professional basketball player
- Lataisia Jones – first black recipient of a Doctor of Philosophy degree at the Florida State University College of Medicine
- Lex Luger – record producer
- Sugar Rodgers – WNBA guard
