= Ras-I Dowling =

American football player and coach (born 1988)

William & Mary Tribe
- Title: Co-defensive coordinator & secondary coach

Personal information
- Born: May 9, 1988 (age 38); Chesapeake, Virginia, U.S.
- Listed height: 6 ft 1 in (1.85 m)
- Listed weight: 200 lb (91 kg)

Career information
- High school: Deep Creek (Chesapeake)
- College: Virginia (2007–2010)
- NFL draft: 2011: 2nd round, 33rd overall pick

Career history

Playing
- New England Patriots (2011–2012); New York Jets (2013–2014)*; Oakland Raiders (2014); Carolina Panthers (2015–2016)*
- * Offseason or practice squad member only

Coaching
- Howard (2017) Defensive quality control; Howard (2018) Cornerbacks coach; William & Mary (2019) Cornerbacks coach; William & Mary (2020–2022) Secondary coach; William & Mary (2023–present) Co-defensive coordinator & secondary coach

Awards and highlights
- 2× Second-team All-ACC (2008, 2009)

Career NFL statistics
- Total tackles: 11
- Pass deflections: 1
- Stats at Pro Football Reference

Ras-I Luis Dowling (/ˈrɑːsaɪ/ RAH-sye; born May 9, 1988) is an American football coach and former player who is the co-defensive coordinator and secondary coach for the William & Mary Tribe. He played professionally as a safety in the National Football League (NFL).

Dowling played college football for the Virginia Cavaliers. He was selected by the New England Patriots in the second round of the 2011 NFL draft. He was also a member of the New York Jets, Oakland Raiders and Carolina Panthers.

== Early life ==
Dowling was born in Chesapeake, Virginia. He attended Deep Creek High School in Chesapeake, where he played defensive back, wide receiver, and some quarterback. As a senior, he recorded 60 tackles and two interceptions as a defensive back. As a receiver he had 14 receptions for 255 yards and four touchdowns.

== College career ==
Dowling attended the University of Virginia. As a freshman in 2007 Dowling played in 12 games, recording 44 tackles and two interceptions. As a sophomore in 2008 he started nine of 11 games. He finished the season with 43 tackles and a team-leading three interceptions. In 2009 Ras-I Dowling was voted All-ACC second team. He was also awarded ACC Defensive Player of the week vs. Indiana with nine tackles and the first sack of his career. He ended the season with three interceptions. Dowling was voted 2010 Pre-season All-ACC selection and second team All-American for the first time in his career.

== Professional career ==
Pre-draft measurables
Height	Weight	Arm length	Hand span	Wingspan	40-yard dash	10-yard split	20-yard split	Bench press
6 ft 1 3/8 in (1.86 m)	198 lb (90 kg)	31 in (0.79 m)	9 1/2 in (0.24 m)	6 ft 2 3/4 in (1.90 m)	4.56 s	1.66 s	2.65 s	19 reps
All values from NFL Combine

=== New England Patriots ===
Dowling was selected with the first pick of the second round (33rd overall) by the New England Patriots in the 2011 NFL draft.

Dowling played two games for the Patriots in the 2011 season before injuring his hip in Week 2 against San Diego. On October 29, 2011, the Patriots placed him on Injured Reserve, ending his 2011 season.

On October 26, 2012, Dowling was placed on injured reserve with a torn thigh muscle, ending his 2012 season. On August 28, 2013, the Patriots released Dowling as part of their roster cutdown to 75 players.

=== New York Jets ===
The New York Jets signed Dowling to the practice squad on October 23, 2013. He was released on August 24, 2014.

=== Oakland Raiders ===
On September 1, 2014, Dowling was signed to the Raiders' practice squad. On December 13, 2014, the Oakland Raiders signed Dowling to the active roster.

On September 1, 2015, he was released by the Raiders.

=== Carolina Panthers ===
On November 23, 2015, Dowling was signed to the Carolina Panthers' practice squad.

On February 7, 2016, Dowling's Panthers played in Super Bowl 50. In the game, the Panthers fell to the Denver Broncos by a score of 24–10.

== Coaching career ==
On January 14, 2019, William & Mary head football coach Mike London hired Dowling to serve as the cornerbacks coach for the William & Mary Football team. After serving as Secondary coach over the next three seasons, Dowling was promoted to Co-Defensive coordinator.
