= Indian River High School (Chesapeake, Virginia) =

Location
- 1969 Braves Trail; Chesapeake, Virginia 23325; United States; 36.7982°N 76.2426°W

Information
- School type: Public high school
- Founded: 1967 (original Old Greenbrier Road facility), 1972 (current location)
- School district: Chesapeake City Public Schools
- Superintendent: Jared A. Cotton
- Principal: Naomi Dunbar
- Teaching staff: 122.37 (FTE)
- Grades: 9–12
- Enrollment: 1,695 (2023-24)
- Student to teacher ratio: 13.85
- Language: English
- Campus: Suburban
- Colors: Columbia Blue, Navy Blue and White
- Athletics conference: Virginia High School League; Class 5 Region A Southeastern District
- Mascot: Brave
- Rival: Oscar F. Smith High School; Great Bridge High School; Deep Creek High School; Grassfield High School
- Communities served: Norfolk Highlands; Indian River Estates; Georgetown Colony; Georgetown Point; Georgetown East; Ipswich; Holly Glenn; Holly Point
- Feeder schools: Greenbrier Middle and Indian River Middle
- Website: https://www.cpschools.com/o/irh

Indian River High School is a high school in Chesapeake, Virginia. As of the 2023-24 school year, it had approximately 1600 students.

== History ==
The school originally opened in the fall of 1963 for 7th graders. From that day forward they were always the 'seniors' at Indian River Junior High. In their Junior ['67-'68] year the school board was petitioned and the school was upgraded to Indian River Senior High. There were approximately 185 students that graduated in 1969. Their dedication and pride got the school accredited. They set the traditions in motion. A mother of one of the students wrote the Alma Mater, they picked the school colors, the mascot. The original IRHS, which opened in 1967, was on Old Greenbrier Road, while construction on the current building took place. The single-story facility opened in winter 1972 on Dunbarton Road, receiving its own address of 1969 Braves Trail in the mid-1990s. The Old Greenbrier Road building currently serves as Indian River Middle School. The 1969 in the school's address refers to IRHS' first graduating class.

In 1995, overcrowding at Indian River forced the school to add an extension, known as the "new wing."

Starting in the summer of 2011, construction began to renovate and again expand the school. Those renovations ended in time for the 2013-14 school year.

== Athletics ==
The school boasts several Southeastern District athletic titles, such as the two-year title-holding Academic Challenge team, as well as Eastern Region titles in football, and boys and girls basketball. The Braves enjoy a long rivalry with Oscar F. Smith High School, Great Bridge High School, and Deep Creek High School.

State championships:

- Football, 1995 (12-2 overall record)
- Boys basketball, 1986-87 (29-1 record, undefeated in the AAA Southeastern District. Alonzo Mourning of the Miami Heat played for this squad)
- Marching Band, 2012 (3-0 up to the state 2 Open championship), 9th place at USBands National Championships at MetLife Stadium in East Rutherford, New Jersey.

State championship runners-up:

- Girls basketball, 2002-03 (34-1 record, also undefeated in district play, 14-0)
- Boys volleyball, 2017-18 (19-4 record)

== Notable alumni ==
- James Boyd, played with the Jacksonville Jaguars as a free safety; was the school's quarterback during its 1995 state championship run
- Mark Earley, former Attorney General of Virginia
- William Fuller, former NFL player
- Gregory D. Gadson, (Ret), retired U.S. Army colonel, garrison commander Ft. Belvoir, Virginia. Also an actor featured as Lieutenant Colonel Mick Canales, Battleship (2012).
- Frank Hassell (born 1988), basketball player
- LaMareon James, NFL cornerback
- Alonzo Mourning, former NBA player with the Charlotte Hornets, Miami Heat, and New Jersey Nets; won an NBA title with the Heat in 2006
- Branden Ore, Former Virginia Tech football player
- Jay Pharoah, comedian, Saturday Night Live cast member
- Ricky Rudd, NASCAR driver
- Nate Smith is a drummer, songwriter, producer and three time Grammy nominee.
- Andrew Brown NFL DE 2019 to 2022
- Tavante Beckett NFL LB 2021 to 2021
- Chris Peace NFL DE 2019 to 2019
- Jamaine Winborne NFL DB 2006 to 2007
- George Crump NFL DE 1982 to 1982
- Mike Voight NFL RB 1977 to 1977
