= Keith Burnell =

American gridiron football player (born 1979)

Profile
- Position: Running back / Cornerback

Personal information
- Born: January 8, 1979 (age 47); Norfolk, Virginia, U.S.
- Listed height: 5 ft 11 in (1.80 m)
- Listed weight: 205 lb (93 kg)

Career information
- High school: Western Branch (Chesapeake, Virginia)
- College: Virginia Tech (1998–2001); Delaware (2002)
- NFL draft: 2003: undrafted

Career history
- Green Bay Packers (2003)*; New York Jets (2003)*; Oakland Raiders (2003–2004)*; New York Jets (2004)*; Baltimore Ravens (2005)*; Hamilton Tiger-Cats (2005)
- * Offseason or practice squad member only

Keith Tyrone Burnell (born January 8, 1979) is an American former football and Canadian football running back and cornerback who played for one season in the Canadian Football League (CFL) for the Hamilton Tiger-Cats in 2005. He played college football for Virginia Tech and Delaware, and spent time on practice squads and offseason rosters for the Green Bay Packers, New York Jets, Oakland Raiders, and Baltimore Ravens of the National Football League (NFL).

== Professional career ==
=== National Football League ===
Burnell was signed by the Green Bay Packers as an undrafted free agent on May 3, 2003, as a defensive back. He also played running back in college. He was moved to running back on July 26 during training camp after an injury to another running back in practice. He was waived during final roster cuts on August 25, 2003. He was signed to the New York Jets' practice squad on September 30, 2003, but was released on October 15. He was signed to the Oakland Raiders' practice squad on November 5. He was signed to a futures contract on December 29, 2003. After spending training camp in 2004 with the Raiders, he was waived on August 4, 2004. He re-signed with the Jets on August 15, 2004, but was waived on August 24. He was re-signed to the Jets' practice squad on October 14. He was signed by the Baltimore Ravens to a futures contract on February 3, 2005. After spending training camp with the Ravens in 2005, he was waived during final roster cuts on August 29.

=== Canadian Football League ===
Burnell signed with the Hamilton Tiger-Cats on November 3, 2005. He played in one game for the Tiger-Cats, and was re-signed to a contract on May 3, 2006. He was released on May 10.
