= Hickory High School (Virginia) =

Location
- 1996 Hawk Boulevard; Chesapeake, Virginia 23322; United States; 36°38′52.9″N 76°12′55.9″W

Information
- School type: Public high school
- Founded: 1996
- Locale: Rural, Fringe
- School district: Chesapeake City Public Schools
- NCES District ID: 5100810
- Superintendent: Jared Cotton
- NCES School ID: 510081001482
- Principal: Donna Weingand
- Teaching staff: 111.41 (on an FTE basis)
- Grades: 9–12
- Enrollment: 1,600 (2024–25)
- Student to teacher ratio: 14.36
- Language: English
- Colors: Teal, Grey, Black and White ███
- Song: Singing we do implore Hickory High school ever more With teal, grey, black and white Hickory High School, show your might! Our Alma Mater guide With Spirit and with pride Where mighty hawks do soar Mighty hawks forever more!
- Athletics conference: Virginia High School League; AAA Eastern Region; Southeastern District
- Mascot: Hawk
- Rivals: Grassfield High School; Great Bridge High School
- Feeder schools: Hickory Middle School
- Website: https://www.cpschools.com/o/hhs

Hickory High School (Hickory, Virginia) is a high school in Chesapeake, Virginia. There are approximately 1,600 students. The mascot is a hawk and the school colors are teal, grey, white, and black.

Owing to the overwhelming number of students, a new school, Grassfield High School, was built nearby.

== Extracurriculars ==
Hickory High School activities include:

- Cheerleading - 2004-2005 District and Regional Champions, 2005-2006 District and Regional Champions, 5th in State, 2007-2008 2nd in state, State 5A Champion 2014.
- Scholastic Bowl - 2008 District and Regional Champions, 2010/2011 District Champs
- Marching band - USSBA State Champions and Mid Atlantic Champions
- Winter Guard - AIA Finalists 3 years running
- Winter Percussion - WGI Champions 2012
- Chamber orchestra - Under the direction of Steve Campbell
- Dance team
- Robotics - 2009 Rookie All-Star and 2011 Team Spirit Award at VCU Regional, 2019 Team Spirit Award at Portsmouth and 2019 Imagery Award at Blacksburg, 2018 Gracious Professionalism award at Hampton Roads and Southeast Virginia events.

The 2007-2008 Scholastic Bowl Team won the titles of Southeastern District Champions and Southeastern District Season Champions and Eastern Region Champions, and finished the season with a 21-3 record, coming in third place in the 2008 state championship. The team also came in third in the 2009 season, finishing with a 20-4 record.

In 2011, Hickory's Technology Student Association team, led by Chandler Perry and Joseph Cathey, placed 4th at the National TSA conference in Digital Video Production.

=== Band and Marching Band ===
In 2011, the Marching Hawks placed second in the Bands of America Towson Regional Championship and then placed eighth in finals at the Bands of America Indianapolis Super Regional Championship later that year. The band has consistently made finals in many Bands of America Regional and Super Regional Championships (such as Towson, Delaware, and Indianapolis). The Marching Hawks have been named USSBA Mid Atlantic and State champions.

Hickory's Winter Percussion were the 2012 WGI Scholastic Concert Open Champions, and Hickory's Winter Guard has been AIA finalists multiple times. Hickory's Wind Ensemble participated in the Music for All National Festival in 2014.

=== Athletics ===
Hickory High School athletics include:

- Football
- Golf - seven-time Southeastern Champions
- Volleyball
- Basketball
- Wrestling
- Soccer
- Track & Field
- Swimming
- Tennis
- Cheerleading - 2004, 2005, 2006 District and Regional Champions (3rd, 5th, and 2nd in State), 2014 State (5A) Champions
- Gymnastics - 2015 District, Regional and State (5A) Champions
- Cross Country- 2012 District and Regional Champions
- Baseball - State (5A) Champions 2014
- Softball - 2008 Virginia State Champions
- Field Hockey
- Swim & Dive
- Crew
- Lacrosse
  - Led by local Superstar James Bridges

In 2005, Hickory's Men's Soccer team was ranked 2nd nationally going 25-0 before losing to Cox 1-0 in the Regional Semi-Finals.

On June 7, 2008, the Lady Hawks Softball team defeated Battlefield High School 4-2 to win the Virginia State Softball Championship. The first state championship in sports in the school's history.

On October 3, 2008, Hickory's Football Team beat Grassfield High School on homecoming night. At the time, it was ranked tenth in the region. This win was the first under the new direction of Coach Sitterson.

In 2007, Hickory's men's volleyball team was one game away from an appearance in the AAA state tournament losing to First Colonial High 0-3 at regionals.

In 2008, Hickory's lacrosse team was formed. Hickory went 0-10 in its inaugural season, only to go undefeated in regional play the next year.

In 2009, Hickory's men's soccer team advanced to the AAA state semi-finals only to lose 2-1 in the semis.

In 2011, Hickory's scholastic bowl team was 1st in district, 2nd in region, and 3rd in state.

In 2013, Hickorys Cheer Team won the 5A State Championship.

In 2014, Hickory's baseball team won the 5A State Championship, their first in school history.

In 2014, Hickory's Cheer Team won the 5A State Championship, successfully defending their title and it marked the 4th State Championship for the school in its history, and the 3rd in the last year.

== Notable alumni ==
- Lauren Coughlin, professional golfer and multiple time winner on LPGA Tour
- Ciara Sivels, nuclear engineer
- Scott Sizemore, professional baseball infielder with the Oakland Athletics of Major League Baseball
- David Wright, New York Mets third baseman and seven time Major League All Star
