= George L. Hanbury II =

American academic (born 1943)

George L. Hanbury II (born 1943) is an American academic, and the President of Nova Southeastern University. Hanbury graduated with his bachelor's degree from Virginia Tech, a master's degree from Old Dominion University and his doctorate from Florida Atlantic University. He became the President of Nova Southeastern University in 2010. In September 2023, he announced his resignation where he will be stepping down on January 1, 2025. George earned the rank of Eagle Scout in Troop 14 in Norfolk, Virginia and was presented a Lifetime Achievement Award from the South Florida Council, Boy Scouts of America on October 12, 2023.
