= Sara Pozzi =

Italian nuclear engineer

Sara A. Pozzi is an Italian nuclear engineer. She is the co-author of the MCNPX-PoliMi code for Monte Carlo simulation of neutron transport and nuclear fission, and she studies methods for detecting nuclear materials and their application in preventing nuclear proliferation. She is a University Diversity and Social Transformation Professor at the University of Michigan, jointly appointed to the Department of Nuclear Engineering and Radiological Sciences and the Department of Physics, director of the Consortium for Monitoring, Technology, and Verification, and director of diversity, equity, and inclusion for the University of Michigan College of Engineering.

== Education and career ==
Pozzi studied nuclear engineering at the Polytechnic University of Milan, earning a laurea (the equivalent of a master's degree) in 1997 and completing her Ph.D. there in 2001. Her doctoral dissertation, Fast-Time Correlation Measurements in Nuclear Safeguards, was advised by Marzio Marseguerra.

After postdoctoral research at the Polytechnic University of Milan, she was a researcher at the Oak Ridge National Laboratory from 2002 until moving to the University of Michigan in 2007, as an associate professor in the Department of Nuclear Engineering and Radiological Sciences. She was tenured there in 2010, promoted to full professor in 2015, and added a joint appointment in the Department of Physics in 2018.

She founded the Detection for Nuclear Nonproliferation Group in 2007, and the Consortium for Verification Technology in 2014.

== Recognition ==
Pozzi was named as a Fellow of the American Nuclear Society in 2017, and a Fellow of the Institute of Nuclear Materials Management in 2018. She was named an IEEE Fellow, in the 2020 class of fellows, "for contributions to neutron detection techniques and neutron transport Monte Carlo methods".
