= Southeastern District (VHSL) =

The Southeastern District is a district of the Virginia High School League. The schools in the Southeastern District compete in the 6A, 5A, and 4A divisions.

The members of the Southeastern District are all the public high schools in Chesapeake City and Suffolk City. This is one of the faster-growing regions in the Commonwealth.

== Member schools ==
- Deep Creek High School of Chesapeake, Virginia
- Grassfield High School of Chesapeake, Virginia
- Great Bridge High School of Chesapeake, Virginia
- Hickory High School of Chesapeake, Virginia
- Indian River High School of Chesapeake, Virginia
- King's Fork High School of Suffolk, Virginia
- Lakeland High School of Suffolk, Virginia
- Nansemond River High School of Suffolk, Virginia
- Oscar Smith High School of Chesapeake, Virginia
- Western Branch High School of Chesapeake, Virginia

== Former Members ==
- Cradock High School (Portsmouth)
- Woodrow Wilson High School (Portsmouth)
- Manor High School (Portsmouth)
- IC Norcom High School (Portsmouth)
- Churchland High School (Portsmouth)
