= Steve DeLong =

American football player (1943–2010)

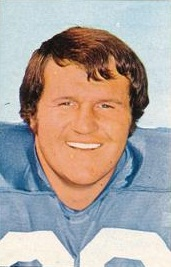
- DeLong c. 1971

No. 56, 82, 87
- Positions: Defensive end, Defensive tackle

Personal information
- Born: July 3, 1943; Norfolk, Virginia, U.S.
- Died: August 18, 2010 (aged 67); Knoxville, Tennessee, U.S.
- Listed height: 6 ft 2 in (1.88 m)
- Listed weight: 252 lb (114 kg)

Career information
- High school: Oscar F. Smith (South Norfolk, Virginia)
- College: Tennessee
- NFL draft: 1965: 1st round, 6th overall pick
- AFL draft: 1965: 1st round, 6th overall pick

Career history
- San Diego Chargers (1965-1971); Chicago Bears (1972)

Awards and highlights
- AFL All-Star (1969); AFL sacks leader (1969); Outland Trophy (1964); 2× First-team All-American (1963, 1964); 2× First-team All-SEC (1963, 1964); Senior Bowl MVP (1965)

Career NFL/AFL statistics
- Fumble recoveries: 1
- Interceptions: 1
- Sacks: 37.5
- Stats at Pro Football Reference
- College Football Hall of Fame

Steven Cyril DeLong (July 3, 1943 – August 18, 2010) was an American professional football player who was a defensive lineman in the American Football League (AFL) and National Football League (NFL). He was a first-round selection in both the AFL and NFL drafts in 1965. He played collegiately for the Tennessee Volunteers, and professionally for the San Diego Chargers and Chicago Bears. He was a two-time All-American at Tennessee playing middle guard on defense, and was awarded the Outland Trophy as a senior in 1964 as the best interior lineman in college football. In 1993, he was inducted into the College Football Hall of Fame. In 1969 with San Diego, he set a team record with 17 sacks, a mark which stood until Gary Johnson had 17 1/2 in 1980.

== Early life ==
DeLong was born on July 3, 1943, in Norfolk, Virginia. He attended Oscar F. Smith High School (located in Chesapeake, Virginia). He played tackle on the school's football team. He was 6 ft 2 in (1.88 m) and 225 lb (102.1 kg) as a senior in 1960. Oscar Smith finished that season 7–3.

In 1959 and 1960, DeLong was selected All-Eastern District and All-State. As a senior in 1960, he was also All-Metropolitan and an All-American. DeLong was a coaches' selection to the first team on both the 1959 and 1960 Virginian-Pilot All-Tidewater Teams. He was selected to the Associated Press's (AP) second-team statewide All-Group I-A All-Star Team.

== College career ==
DeLong attended the University of Tennessee, where he played on the Tennessee Volunteers (Vols) football team in the Southeastern Conference (SEC). DeLong was the team's middle guard (defensive tackle) from 1962 to 1964, playing for three head coaches (Bowden Wyatt 1962, Jim McDonald 1963, and Doug Dickey 1964). The Associated Press (AP) named him to its All-Sophomore Team in 1962, and he was second-team All-SEC that season. He also played on the offensive line at Tennessee. He wore No. 65 at Tennessee.

He was team captain in 1964, as a senior. The AP named him lineman-of-the-week in late October 1964, for his performance on October 24 against Louisiana State University (LSU). During the game, DeLong spearheaded the Vols' defense on consecutive plays in stopping LSU from scoring a touchdown just one foot from the goal line. DeLong led Tennessee's defense in applying pressure throughout the game, and Tennessee head coach Doug Dickey called it possibly the best game of DeLong's career. In choosing him for the lineman-of-the-week award, the AP picked DeLong over Dick Butkus and Tommy Nobis, among others. While Tennessee was not a successful team, the DeLong-led defense allowed only 121 points in 10 games during the 1964 season. Dickey described DeLong as "a great player on a very average team".

As a senior in 1964, DeLong was awarded the Outland Trophy as the nation's top interior lineman. He also was selected Lineman of the Year by the Columbus Touchdown Club, the Birmingham Touchdown Club and Look magazine. He was a first-team All-American in both his junior (1963) and senior (1964) years. He was SEC defensive lineman of the year three times; and first team All-SEC in 1963 and 1964.

DeLong was the Most Valuable Player in the 1964 Senior Bowl. He was team captain for the East team in the East-West Shrine Bowl. He was selected to play in the Chicago College All-Star Game in 1965.

== Professional career ==
The Chicago Bears drafted DeLong in the first round of the 1965 NFL draft (6th overall). The Bears had three of the first six draft picks that year, and had taken future Hall of Famers Dick Butkus (No. 3) and Gale Sayers (No. 4) ahead of DeLong. The San Diego Chargers selected DeLong in the first round of the 1965 AFL draft (6th overall). Bears' assistant coach and personnel director, and a future Hall of Fame head coach, George Allen was in charge of the Bears' draft that season. He later said he had reached an agreement with DeLong and when presenting it for finalization to Bears' owner George Halas, DeLong added that he also wanted a car. Halas asked what kind of car, and DeLong said "nothing fancy ... Ford, Chevrolet". Halas responded "Well kid ... I know where you could get a good used car". DeLong chose to play for the Chargers.

In 1970, DeLong himself said "I didn't like the weather there ... It was 16 below zero the day I visited Chicago. Another thing was that they were an old team. San Diego was a young club and I liked the opportunity. I've never regretted the choice". DeLong had a seven-year career with the Chargers, before finishing his career with one final NFL season as a Chicago Bear.

As a rookie, DeLong was assigned to play defensive end. He appeared in 12 games, without a start. He played mostly on special teams. The Chargers were 9–2–3 in 1965, and reached the AFL championship game, losing 23–0 to the Buffalo Bills. DeLong was questionable to play in the championship game because of an injury, but is said to have played in that game.

Head coach Sid Gillman made DeLong a starter at right defensive tackle in 1966. DeLong replaced 1965 starting All-AFL right tackle Ernie Ladd, who left the Chargers for the Houston Oilers before the 1966 season after an extended dispute over salary, trades and free agency. DeLong started 12 games and had three quarterback sacks that season.

In 1967, Gillman moved DeLong to defensive end. He and DeLong believed the move would benefit DeLong, as playing tackle on the professional level had proved challenging for DeLong. Before the season even started, however, DeLong suffered a broken ankle in an August 27 exhibition game against the Los Angeles Rams. DeLong did not return to play until November. He only started seven games that season, playing left defensive end. He had 1.5 sacks.

Going into the 1968 season, DeLong believed that he could change his career trajectory, and meet the potential ascribed to him coming out of college three seasons earlier. Before the season, defensive line coach Bum Phillips believed that positioning DeLong based on his being left-handed would be important for DeLong's improvement. DeLong was moved to right defensive end for that reason. He started all 14 Chargers' games at right defensive end, and led the Chargers with six sacks. After the season, DeLong believed the move to right end based on his being left-handed had helped him have his best season in the AFL to date.

DeLong's best professional season was in 1969. He started all 14 games at right defensive end for the Chargers, and was named to the AFL All-Star Game for the first and only time in his career. He was voted the team's most valuable player that season. He was named second-team All-AFL by the Newspaper Enterprise Association.

In 1969, DeLong led the AFL in quarterback sacks. Quarterback sacks did not become an official statistic in the NFL until 1982. It has been reported variously that DeLong had 15.5, 17, or 17.5 sacks during the 1969 season. It was reported in 1980 that Chargers defensive tackle Gary "Big Hands" Johnson had 17.5 sacks, breaking DeLong's team record of 17. Johnson played a 16-game season, and DeLong a 14-game season. DeLong also blocked an extra point conversion and a field goal attempt in the 1969 season.

In 1970 and 1971, DeLong started every Chargers game, playing right defensive end. He had 5.5 sacks in 1970 and three in 1971. He had the first and only interception of his career in 1970. The Chargers acquired defensive ends Deacon Jones and Lionel Aldridge before the 1972 season, and their top draft pick in 1972 was a defensive end (Pete Lazetich), making DeLong expendable. On July 26, 1972, the Chargers traded DeLong to the Bears for a fourth-round selection in the 1973 NFL draft (84th overall–Jim Thaxton). Chargers coach Harland Svare said before the trade he appreciated that DeLong had come into training camp in excellent physical condition with a desire to play, and looked better than he had during the 1971 season.

DeLong started 14 games for the Bears in 1972, at right defensive end. He had three sacks. He announced his retirement from professional football in July 1973.

== Legacy and honors ==
Once in the NFL, DeLong realized that unlike college the offensive linemen he faced were often bigger than he was. As a defensive end, his philosophy became to get himself in better physical condition than his opponents, and that during the games he would keep up pressure on opposing linemen in hopes of forcing mistakes. His goal was to move quickly after the ball was snapped and get into the offensive lineman before the offensive lineman could initiate the first contact. He observed that the games were rough because there was contact on every play, but he learned how to take it. DeLong said "You have to enjoy the contact to be out there in the first place". Coach Dickey explained DeLong's excellent play in college as based on DeLong's "quick hands, strong arms and good use of leverage".

In 1993, DeLong was inducted into the College Football Hall of Fame. In 1987, he was inducted into the Oscar Smith Hall of Honor. In 1989, he was inducted into the Tennessee Sports Hall of Fame. In 1990, DeLong was voted by fans to the University of Tennessee’s 100-year all-time team. He was inducted into the Knoxville Sports Hall of Fame in 1993, and inducted into the Virginia Sports Hall of Fame in 2000. In December 2000, he was honored among others as a Southeast Conference Legend.

== Personal life and death ==
He was the father of professional football player Keith DeLong, who played five years with the San Francisco 49ers. Keith DeLong also played for the University of Tennessee, at linebacker. Keith DeLong was a Volunteers' team captain and All-American in 1988, and was selected to the “100 years of Volunteers” team in 1990. During Keith DeLong's career, school publicists created a poster of father and son entitled "Defense by DeLong". DeLong's brother Ken DeLong played for the Vols from 1967 to 1969, and was an All-SEC tight end.

In 2002, DeLong broke his neck after falling down a flight of stairs at his home, while also suffering a bruised spinal cord and lost teeth. He was not discovered until the morning after the fall. He remained partially paralyzed and spent the remainder of his life at the Hillcrest North assisted living facility in Knoxville, Tennessee.

DeLong died on August 18, 2010, in Knoxville.

== See also ==
- List of American Football League players
