= Great Bridge High School =

Location
- 301 West Hanbury Road; Chesapeake, Virginia 23322; United States; 36°41′20.1″N 76°14′26.2″W

Information
- School type: Public high school
- Motto: Tradition and Pride
- Founded: 1907 (119 years ago)
- Locale: City, Large
- School district: Chesapeake City Public Schools
- NCES District ID: 5100810
- Superintendent: Doug Brubaker
- NCES School ID: 510081002031
- Principal: Karen Black
- Teaching staff: 112.99 (on an FTE basis)
- Grades: 9–12
- Enrollment: 1,491 (2024–25)
- Student to teacher ratio: 13.20
- Colors: Green and gold
- Athletics conference: Virginia High School League, Southeastern District, Class 5 Region A
- Mascot: Wildcat
- Feeder schools: Great Bridge Middle School, Crestwood Middle School
- Website: www.cpschools.com/o/gbh

Great Bridge High School is a public secondary school in Chesapeake, Virginia, United States. It is part of Chesapeake City Public Schools.

== History ==
Great Bridge opened in 1907, holding students from 1st through 12th grade. Another, larger building opened in 1924, which also housed students from 1st through 11th grade. In 1954, Great Bridge moved to another new, larger building, which accommodated students in 6th through 12th grade. This building is now the site of Great Bridge Middle School.

In 1983, the current site of Great Bridge High School opened and accommodated students in 10th through 12th grade. The school would later accommodate students in 9th through 12th grade.

== Athletics ==
The school team mascot is the wildcat. The sports teams currently compete in the AAA Southeastern District of the AAA Eastern Region. The women's field hockey team won state championships in 2016, 2017, and 2018.

== Theatre ==
In 2002, the Great Bridge High School Theatre Company placed first at the Virginia Theatre Association One-Act Competition, performing Gilgamesh: Man's First Story. The GBHS Theatre Company won again in 2005, performing The Standard of the Man.

== Notable alumni ==
- Ken Barefoot, NFL football player, Washington Redskins 1968, 1969
- Michael Cuddyer, New York Mets player; ninth overall pick in the 1997 MLB draft by the Minnesota Twins
- Mark Davis, 9th pick of the fourth round of the 1985 NBA draft by the Cleveland Cavaliers
- Dave Elkins, member of the band Mae, on vocals and guitar
- Randy Forbes, U.S. congressman
- Larry Griffin, NFL football player, Pittsburgh Steelers, Houston Oilers; Class of 1981
- George L. Hanbury II, president/CEO, Nova Southeastern University
- Quanitra Hollingsworth, WNBA Minnesota Lynx 9th overall pick 2009
- Lawrence Johnson, 2000 Olympics pole vault silver medalist; 2001 World indoor pole vault champion
- Connor Jones, second round pick in the 2016 MLB draft by the St. Louis Cardinals
- Jim Kitts, NFL football player, Miami Dolphins, Washington Redskins, Green Bay Packers; '90
- Nate Parker, actor; wrestler
- Carlton Powell, Denver Broncos' fifth round pick in 2008 NFL draft
- Chris Rahl, All-American college baseball player at William & Mary
- Chris Richardson, American Idol season six finalist
- B.J. Upton, born Melvin Emanuel Upton Jr., Major League Baseball player
- Justin Upton, Los Angeles Angels player; top pick in the 2005 MLB draft by the Arizona Diamondbacks
- Brianté Weber (born 1992), basketball player in the Israeli Basketball Premier League
- Caine Wilkes, weightlifter
