= Western Branch High School =

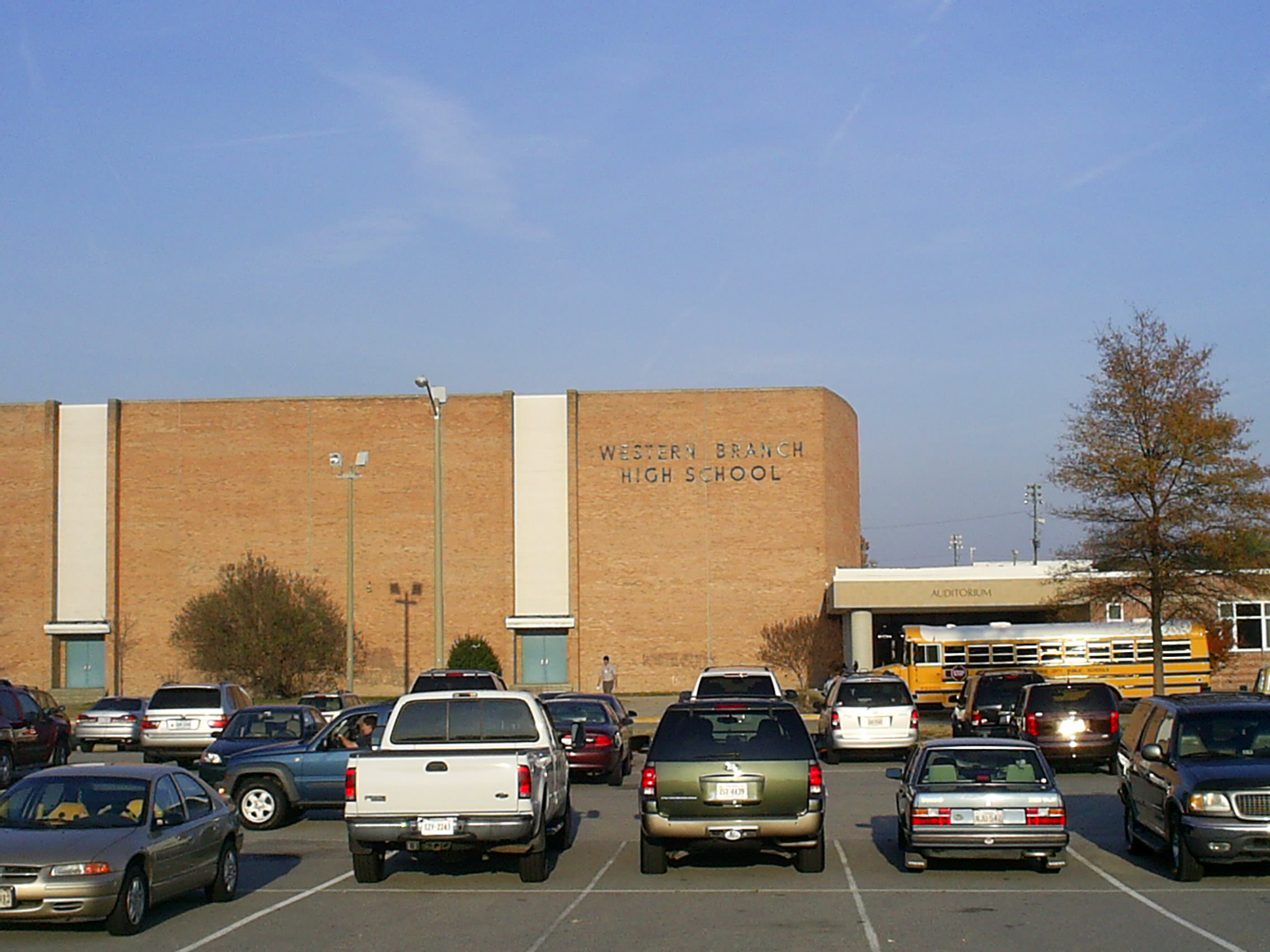

Location
- 1968 Bruin Place; Chesapeake, Virginia 23321; United States; 36°50′53.1″N 76°24′25.4″W

Information
- School type: Public high school
- Established: 1968
- School district: Chesapeake City Public Schools
- Superintendent: Jared A. Cotton
- Principal: John Close
- Faculty: 137.09 (on an FTE basis)
- Grades: 9–12
- Enrollment: 2,116 (2023–24)
- Student to teacher ratio: 15.44
- Colors: Navy blue and gold
- Athletics conference: Virginia High School League; Class 6 Region A Southeastern District
- Mascot: Bruins
- Feeder schools: Jolliff Middle School, Western Branch Middle School
- Website: Official site

Western Branch High School (WBHS) is a suburban high school in Chesapeake, Virginia, United States. Established in 1968, it currently has over 2100 students. The two feeder schools of WBHS are Joliff Middle School and Western Branch Middle School.

After it was determined that redistricting due to the opening of Grassfield High School was not going to impact WBHS, a $40,000,000 construction project was funded to accommodate the larger student body and modernize the technology and facilities. This construction included adding a two-story wing, providing natural lighting for the students, and renovation of the rest of the school. The construction was finished in early September 2010, while the renovation of the existing school was finished in the 2010 through 2011 school year.

== Notable alumni ==
- Mac Quayle (1987), composer
- Patricia Southall (1988), former Miss Virginia USA
- Randy Blythe (1989), lead singer for Lamb of God
- Jimmy Anderson (1994), former MLB pitcher
- Dre Bly (1995), former NFL All-Pro cornerback, coach for the New York Jets
- Keith Burnell (1998), former NFL running back and cornerback
- Andre Douglas (2004), NASA astronaut, Artemis III Mission Specialist
- Josh Baker (2005), former NFL tight end
- Byron Robinson (2013), track and field athlete, Olympian
- Colin Selby (2015), pitcher for the Baltimore Orioles
- yvngxchris (2022), rapper
