= Oscar F. Smith High School =

Coordinates: 36.74035°N 76.25617°W

Location
- 1994 Tiger Drive; Chesapeake, Virginia 23320; United States

Information
- School type: Public high school
- Founded: 1954
- School district: Chesapeake City Public Schools
- Superintendent: Jared A. Cotton
- Principal: Paul A. Joseph
- Teaching staff: 164.07 (on an FTE basis)
- Grades: 9-12
- Enrollment: 2,313 (2023–24)
- Student to teacher ratio: 14.10
- Campus: Suburban
- Colors: Royal Blue, Gold, White ███
- Athletics conference: Class 6 Region A Southeastern District
- Mascot: Tiger
- Communities served: South Norfolk, Crestwood, Oak Grove
- Feeder schools: Crestwood Middle and Oscar Smith Middle
- Website: Official Site

Oscar F. Smith High School (also known as Smith High or OSHS) is a public high school with an enrollment of approximately 2,300 students in grades 9-12. The school is located on a 43-acre (170,000 m^{2}) campus in the Greenbrier West area of the city of Chesapeake, Virginia, United States.

== History ==
A new brick building for the school was built on Rodgers Street in South Norfolk, to replace the aging South Norfolk High School. When South Norfolk merged with Norfolk County to form the city of Chesapeake in 1963, Smith High became part of the new city. The school opened in 1954 and was named after Oscar Frommel Smith (25 October 1891 – 4 May 1950), a Hampton Roads fertilizer magnate and civic leader, who had recently died and whose widow, Ruth, offered the school the $50,000 if it would name the new stadium after her husband. The city council decided that not only the stadium, but the whole school would be named after him.

In 1955 Ruth Smith donated $1,200 the school board to go toward a radio station permit. This resulted in the radio station with callsign WFOS – which stands for "W Frommel Oscar Smith" – founded at the high school and currently located at the Chesapeake Center for Science and Technology, transmitting since 1973 on frequency 88.7 FM MHz for the Southside of Hampton Roads and via radio stream online. WFOS features Blues, Beach, Oldies, R&B and a wide variety of other music, as well as national and local news.

The school moved to its current location on Great Bridge Boulevard and Tiger Drive in Chesapeake's Greenbrier section in 1994. After the move the school kept its old name, and the Rodgers Street building became Oscar F. Smith Middle School. Therefore, Oscar Frommel Smith is the only person to be the namesake of two Chesapeake schools.

Smith High was authorized to begin administering the IB Diploma Program by the International Baccalaureate Organization in 2003 and IB students from all six Chesapeake zones feed into it. Up to 60 applicants are accepted each year for the four-year program. Chesapeake Public Schools' pre-IB academy instruction consists of intensified courses in grades 9 and 10 in English, Spanish or French, social studies, science, and mathematics in preparation for the college-level curriculum of the grade 11-12 diploma program. IB students have the opportunity to earn the International Baccalaureate diploma in addition to the Virginia Advanced Studies Diploma.

As part of his 2008 Presidential Campaign, Barack Obama held a town hall meeting in the J. William Myers gymnasium on 21 August 2008. John Kerry held a similar event in the gym in 2004.

== Facilities ==
One of the newest school buildings in the Chesapeake City Public Schools, Smith High houses some of the newest technology in the district, including numerous networked computer, business, and technology labs, and a 1,000-seat auditorium.

The Linda P. Overton Theatre at the school houses technology for student presentations. In 1994 it was named in honor of Linda Peel Overton (17 June 1939 – 28 February 2017), a past president of the Chesapeake Council of PTA's, past chairperson of the Tidewater Region of the Virginia School Board Association, past member of Board of Directors of Virginia School Board Association, and a nine year member of the School Board for Chesapeake Schools.

The 3,850-seat gymnasium is one of the largest gyms in the Hampton Roads area, housing three full basketball courts. It was named after J. William Myers (23 November 1940 – 16 February 2006) and is also known as the "Dollar Dome" gym, after Myers's nickname, "Dollar Bill". Bill Myers joined the Smith High faculty in 1977 to teach health and physical education. He also served as Athletic Director until his retirement in 2004 and he coached varsity basketball, baseball, track and junior varsity football. In 1994, Bill was inducted into the Oscar Smith High School Athletic Hall of Fame.

The 7,000-seat Beard-DeLong-Easley Field stadium is the home of the Oscar Smith Tigers football team. It was dedicated on 6 September 1996, in honor of three All-American Athletes who graduated from Smith High and who went on to play in the NFL. Edward Leroy Beard (born 9 December 1939 in Chesapeake) attended the school from 1955 to 1959 and played for the San Francisco 49ers from 1965 to 1972. Steven Cyril DeLong (3 July 1943 – 18 August 2010) attended from 1957 to 1961 and was the number one draft pick of the Chicago Bears where he played for one year, and the San Diego Chargers where he played from 1965 to 1972. Kenneth Mason Easley Jr. (born 15 January 1959 in Chesapeake) attended the school from 1973 to 1977 and played for the Seattle Seahawks from 1981 to 1987. In 2017, Easley was inducted into the Pro Football Hall of Fame.

== Athletics ==
The Oscar Smith football team entrance on the field through the so-called "Tiger Cage" is a spectacle. The Oscar Smith Tigers have won 6 state championships in football: 2008, 2011, 2020 (season delayed to spring 2021 due to Covid), fall 2021, 2024 and 2025. The Tigers won their third state title in spring 2021, defeating the South County Stallions in a rematch of the 2019 championship game.

== Orchestra ==
The Oscar F. Smith High School Orchestras have grown from forty eight members to over one hundred members. The orchestras have earned top awards at music festivals in Virginia, Georgia, Maryland, Florida, New York and Indiana and have consistently earned superior ratings at the VBODA/VMEA District IV Orchestra Festival.

The Chamber Orchestra earned a standing ovation for its outstanding performance as the final orchestra performance of the 2005 Virginia Music Educators Association (VMEA) In-Service Conference. They have also performed by invitation at the 2007 National Band & Orchestra Festival in Carnegie Hall, the 2008 and 2011 Music for All National "Orchestra America" Festival in Indianapolis and the 2009 and 2012 ASTA National Orchestra Festival in Atlanta (as a part of the American String Teachers Association's National 'ASTA' Conference).

== Notable alumni ==
- Ed Beard (class of 1959), linebacker for the San Francisco 49ers from 1965 to 1972.
- Steve DeLong (class of 1961), defensive lineman for the San Diego Chargers from 1965 to 1971 and for the Chicago Bears in 1972.
- Kenny Easley (class of 1977), defensive back for the Seattle Seahawks from 1981 to 1987.
- Jamie Burke (class of 1998), USA Women's National Rugby Team from 2004 to 2014, and captain in 2010.
- Greg Boone (class of 2004), player for the Milwaukee Mustangs (arena football) in 2011 and 2012.
- Andrew Brown (class of 2014), defensive tackle for the Cincinnati Bengals from 2018 to present.
- Josh Sweat (class of 2015), defensive end for the Arizona Cardinals from 2025 to present.
- Cam Thomas, shooting guard for the Brooklyn Nets from 2021 to 2026.
- Ethan Vasko (class of 2022), college football quarterback
- Michael Cherry (class of 2013) Track and Field Olympic Gold medalist sprinter
