= 2026 Virginia Question 1 =

Referendum on abortion and related matters

- November 3, 2026
- Question: Should the Constitution of Virginia be amended to (i) protect the freedom to make personal decisions about prenatal care, childbirth, postpartum care, birth control, abortion, miscarriage management, and fertility care; (ii) protect doctors, nurses, and patients from being punished for these decisions; and (iii) allow for restrictions on access to abortion during the third trimester of pregnancy except when the patient's health is at risk or the pregnancy cannot survive?
- Reporting: 96.2% as of 10:35 a.m. EST
- Outcome: Passed

Results
| Choice | Votes | % |
|---|---|---|
| Yes | 2,182,174 | 62.37% |
| No | 1,316,529 | 37.63% |
County and independent city results
Yes
80–90%
70–80%
60–70%
50–60%
No
70–80%
60–70%
50–60%

Question 1 is a legislatively referred constitutional amendment on the November 2026 ballot in the state of Virginia. The measure amended the state's constitution to provide that "every individual has the fundamental right to reproductive freedom, including the ability to make and carry out decisions relating to one's own prenatal care, childbirth, postpartum care, contraception, abortion care, miscarriage management, and fertility care". However, it allowed the legislature to restrict abortion in the third trimester, so long as it is not necessary to protect the life or physical or mental health of the pregnant individual, or if the fetus is not viable.

== Background ==
After the United States Supreme Court's landmark decision in Dobbs v. Jackson Women's Health Organization, which ruled that abortion is not a protected constitutional right, the Virginia General Assembly moved to amend Virginia's constitution to provide its citizens the right to reproductive freedom on February 13, 2025.

== Contents ==
On the ballot, the following will be shown to voters:

Question: Should the Constitution of Virginia be amended to (i) protect the freedom to make personal decisions about prenatal care, childbirth, postpartum care, birth control, abortion, miscarriage management, and fertility care; (ii) protect doctors, nurses, and patients from being punished for these decisions; and (iii) allow for restrictions on access to abortion during the third trimester of pregnancy except when the patient's health is at risk or the pregnancy cannot survive?

If passed, the amendment would add Section 11-A to Article I of the Constitution of Virginia:

Section 11-A. Fundamental right to reproductive freedom.

That every individual has the fundamental right to reproductive freedom, including the ability to make and carry out decisions relating to one's own prenatal care, childbirth, postpartum care, contraception, abortion care, miscarriage management, and fertility care.

An individual's right to reproductive freedom shall not be, directly or indirectly, denied, burdened, or infringed upon unless justified by a compelling state interest achieved by the least restrictive means.

Notwithstanding the above, the Commonwealth may regulate the provision of abortion care in the third trimester, provided that in no circumstance shall the Commonwealth prohibit an abortion (i) that in the professional judgment of a physician is medically indicated to protect the life or physical or mental health of the pregnant individual or (ii) when in the professional judgment of a physician the fetus is not viable.

The Commonwealth shall not discriminate in the protection or enforcement of this fundamental right.

The Commonwealth shall not penalize, prosecute, or otherwise take adverse action against an individual based on such individual's own exercise of this fundamental right or such individual's own actual, potential, perceived, or alleged pregnancy outcomes, including miscarriage, stillbirth, or abortion. The Commonwealth shall not penalize, prosecute, or otherwise take adverse action against any individual for aiding or assisting another individual in exercising such other individual's right to reproductive freedom with such other individual's voluntary consent.

For the purposes of this section, a state interest is compelling only if it is for the limited purpose of maintaining or improving the health of an individual seeking care, consistent with accepted clinical standards of care and evidence-based medicine, and does not infringe on that individual's autonomous decision making.

This section shall be self-executing. Any provision of this section held invalid shall be severable from the remaining portions of the section.

== Endorsements ==
Yes

U.S. senators

- Mark Warner, Virginia (2009–present) (Democratic)

U.S. representatives

- Don Beyer, VA-08 (2015–present) (Democratic)
- James Walkinshaw, VA-11 (2025–present) (Democratic)

Statewide officials

- David Bulova, Virginia Secretary of Natural Resources (2026–present) (Democratic)
- Ghazala Hashmi, lieutenant governor of Virginia (2026–present) (Democratic)
- Jay Jones, attorney general of Virginia (2026–present) (Democratic)
- Candi King, Secretary of the Commonwealth of Virginia (2026–present) (Democratic)
- Abigail Spanberger, governor of Virginia (2026–present) (Democratic)

State legislators

- 59 state delegates (Note: Kimberly Adams, HD-82 (2026–present) (Democratic); Jessica Anderson, HD-71 (2026–present) (Democratic); Bonita Anthony, HD-92 (2024–present) (Democratic); Alex Askew, HD-95 (2024–present) (Democratic); Katrina Callsen, HD-54 (2024–present) (Democratic); Kacey Carnegie, HD-89 (2026–present) (Democratic); Betsy Carr, HD-78 (2024–present) (Democratic); Stacey Carroll, HD-64 (2026–present) (Democratic); Nadarius Clark, HD-84 (2024–present) (Democratic); Laura Jane Cohen, HD-15 (2024–present) (Democratic); Joshua Cole, HD-65 (2024–present) (Democratic); Nicole Cole, HD-66 (2026–present) (Democratic); Kelly Convirs-Fowler, HD-96 (2024–present) (Democratic); Rae Cousins, HD-79 (2024–present) (Democratic); Karrie Delaney, HD-9 (2024–present) (Democratic); Lindsey Dougherty, HD-75 (2026–present) (Democratic); Mark Downey, HD-69 (2026–present) (Democratic); Michael Feggans, HD-97 (2024–present) (Democratic); Lily Franklin, HD-41 (2026–present) (Democratic); Debra Gardner, HD-76 (2024–present) (Democratic); Jackie Glass, HD-93 (2024–present) (Democratic); Elizabeth Guzmán, HD-22 (2026–present) (Democratic); Cliff Hayes, HD-91 (2024–present) (Democratic); Dan Helmer, HD-10 (2024–present) (Democratic); Rozia Henson, HD-19 (2024–present) (Democratic); Phil Hernandez, HD-94 (2024–present) (Democratic); Charniele Herring, HD-4 (2024–present) (Democratic); Patrick Hope, HD-1 (2024–present) (Democratic); Karen Keys-Gamarra, HD-7 (2024–present) (Democratic); Paul Krizek, HD-16 (2024–present) (Democratic); Amy Laufer, HD-55 (2024–present) (Democratic); Destiny LeVere Bolling, HD-80 (2024–present) (Democratic); Alfonso Lopez, HD-3 (2024–present) (Democratic); Michelle Maldonado, HD-20 (2024–2026) (Democratic); Marty Martinez, HD-29 (2024–present) (Democratic); John McAuliff, HD-30 (2026–present) (Democratic); Adele McClure, HD-2 (2024–present) (Democratic); Delores McQuinn, HD-81 (2024–present) (Democratic); Leslie Mehta, HD-73 (2026–present) (Democratic); May Nivar, HD-57 (2026–present) (Democratic); Marcia Price, HD-85 (2024–present) (Democratic); Sam Rasoul, HD-38 (2024–present) (Democratic); Atoosa Reaser, HD-27 (2024–present) (Democratic); David Reid, HD-28 (2024–present) (Democratic); Don Scott, Speaker (2024–present) HD-88 (2020–present) (Democratic); Holly Seibold, HD-12 (2024–present) (Democratic); Briana Sewell, HD-25 (2024–present) (Democratic); Irene Shin, HD-8 (2024–present) (Democratic); Marcus Simon, HD-13 (2024–present) (Democratic); Shelly Simonds, HD-70 (2024–present) (Democratic); Jas Jeet Singh, HD-26 (2025–present) (Democratic); Rip Sullivan, HD-6 (2024–present) (Democratic); Joshua Thomas, HD-21 (2024–present) (Democratic); Virgil Thornton Sr., HD-86 (2026–present) (Democratic); Luke Torian, HD-24 (2024–present) (Democratic); Kathy Tran, HD-18 (2024–present) (Democratic); Jeion Ward, HD-87 (2024–present) (Democratic); Vivian Watts, HD-14 (2024–present) (Democratic); Rodney Willett, HD-58 (2024–present) (Democratic))
- 5 state senators (Note: Lashrecse Aird, state senator from the 13th district (2024–present) (Democratic); Elizabeth Bennett-Parker, 39th district (2026–present) (Democratic); Jennifer Boysko, state senator from the 33rd district (2019–2024), 38th district (2024–present) (Democratic); Barbara Favola, state senator from the 31st district (2012–2024), 40th district (2024–present) (Democratic); Michael Jones, state senator from the 15th district (2026–present) (Democratic); Scott Surovell, state senator from the 36th district (2016–2024), 34th district (2024–present) (Democratic))

Labor unions

- SEIU Virginia State Council

Organizations

- ACLU Virginia
- American College of Obstetricians and Gynecologists Virginia
- Catholics for Choice
- Democratic Socialists of America
- Equality Virginia
- Fairness Project
- Freedom from Religion Foundation
- Jews United for Justice
- League of Women Voters
- Metro DC Democratic Socialists of America
- National Council of Jewish Women Virginia
- National Latina Institute for Reproductive Justice
- National Women's Political Caucus of Virginia
- Planned Parenthood Virginia
- Reproductive Freedom for All
- Virginia National Organization for Women

Political parties

- Democratic Party of Virginia
No

Federal officials

- Todd Gilbert, former United States Attorney for the Western District of Virginia (2025) (Republican)

Statewide officials

- Winsome Earle-Sears, former lieutenant governor of Virginia (2022–2026) (Republican)

State legislators

- 7 state delegates (Note: Tim Anderson, former state delegate from the 83rd district (2022–2023) (Republican); Mark Earley Jr., HD-73 (2024–2026) (Republican); Bob Marshall, HD-13 (1992–2018) (Republican); Delores Riley Oates, state delegate from the 31st district (2023–present) (Republican); Wendell Walker, state delegate from the 52nd district (2024–present) (Republican); Michael Webert, state delegate from the 18th district (2012–2024), 61st district (2024–present) (Republican); Bill Wiley, state delegate from the 32nd district (2024–present) (Republican))
- 3 state senators (Note: Tara Durant, state senator from the 27th district (2024–present) (Republican); Ryan McDougle, state senator from the 4th district (2006–2024), 26th district (2024–present) (Republican); Mark Peake, state senator from the 22nd district (2017–2024), 8th district (2024–present) (Republican))

Individuals

- John Reid, talk radio host and nominee for lieutenant governor in 2025 (Republican)
- Michael Francis Burbidge, bishop of the Diocese of Arlington
- Barry C. Knestout, bishop of the Diocese of Richmond

Organizations

- American Center for Law & Justice
- Do No Harm
- Family Foundation of Virginia
- Heritage Action
- Liberty Counsel
- Live Action
- National Right to Life Committee
- Priests for Life
- Students for Life
- Susan B. Anthony Pro-Life America
- Virginia Catholic Conference
- Virginia Society for Human Life
- Women Speak Out

Political parties

- Republican Party of Virginia

== Polling ==
| Poll source | Date(s) administered | Sample size (Note: Key: A – all adults RV – registered voters LV – likely voters V – unclear) | Margin of error | Phrasing | Support | Oppose | Undecided |
|---|---|---|---|---|---|---|---|
| Virginia Commonwealth University | December 18, 2024 – January 15, 2025 | 806 (A) | ± 4.73% | "This past November, the Virginia House of Delegates advanced a joint resolution seeking to place abortion rights in the Virginia State Constitution. Do you agree or disagree with this resolution?" | 62% | 30% | 9% |
| The Wason Center | January 6–13, 2025 | 806 (RV) | ± 3.60% | "Would you support or oppose amending Virginia's constitution to guarantee reproductive rights, such as access to contraception and abortion?" | 61% | 32% | 8% |

== Results ==
Right to Reproductive Freedom Amendment results
Choice
For
Against
Total

== See also ==
- 2022 Kansas abortion referendum
- 2022 California Proposition 1
- 2022 Michigan Proposal 3
- 2022 Vermont Proposal 5
- November 2023 Ohio Issue 1
- 2024 Arizona Proposition 139
- 2024 Colorado Amendment 79
- 2024 Florida Amendment 4
- 2024 Maryland Question 1
- 2024 Missouri Amendment 3
- 2024 Montana Initiative 128
- 2024 Nebraska Initiative 439
- 2024 Nevada Question 6
- 2024 New York Proposal 1
- 2024 South Dakota Amendment G
- 2024 United States ballot measures
- 2026 Idaho Proposition 1
- 2026 Missouri Amendment 3
- 2026 Nevada Question 6
