= Cheryl Turpin =

American politician (born 1963)

Member of the Virginia House of Delegates from the 85th district
- In office January 10, 2018 – January 8, 2020
- Preceded by: Rocky Holcomb
- Succeeded by: Alex Askew

Personal details
- Born: Cheryl Baldwin Turpin; 1963 (age 62–63) Fort Bragg, North Carolina, U.S.
- Party: Democratic
- Children: 2
- Education: Virginia Commonwealth University (B.S.); University of Virginia (M.Ed.)
- Profession: Teacher

Cheryl Baldwin Turpin (born 1963) is an American politician who served as the delegate in the Virginia House of Delegates for the 85th district representing a part of Virginia Beach from 2018 to 2020. She is a member of the Democratic Party.

== Early life and career ==
Turpin was born at Womack Hospital in Fort Bragg, North Carolina, in 1963 to George and Patricia Baldwin. She grew up in a military family that eventually settled in Fairfax County, Virginia. She has worked as a science teacher in Virginia Beach, most recently teaching at Frank W. Cox High School where she teaches Advanced Placement Environmental Science.

== Political career ==
She won the general election to the Virginia House of Delegates for the 85th district held on November 7, 2017, to succeed Rocky Holcomb, whom she had lost to in a special election earlier in the year. In March 2019, Turpin declared her candidacy for the Senate of Virginia's 7th district after state senator Frank Wagner announced his retirement. She won the June 11 primary with 58% of the vote. In the November 2019 general election, Turpin lost to Republican Jen Kiggans by about a 1% margin.

== Electoral history ==
Date	Election	Candidate	Party	Votes	%
Virginia House of Delegates, 85th district
Jan 10, 2017	Special	Rocky Holcomb	Republican	3,301	52.8
Jan 10, 2017	Special	Cheryl Turpin	Democratic	2,939	47.0
Jan 10, 2017	Special	Write Ins		7	0.01
Jan 10, 2017	Special	The seat was open because incumbent Scott Taylor was elected to the US House of Representatives in Nov 2016; seat stayed Republican			
Nov 7, 2017	General	Cheryl Turpin	Democratic	11,848	50.73
Nov 7, 2017	General	Rocky Holcomb	Republican	11,454	49.06
Nov 7, 2017	General	Write Ins		48	0.21
Nov 7, 2017	General	Incumbent lost; seat switched from Republican to Democratic			
Virginia Senate, 7th district
June 11, 2019	Primary	Cheryl Turpin	Democratic	3,268	58.78
June 11, 2019	Primary	Susan B. Hippen	Democratic	1,531	27.54
June 11, 2019	Primary	Kim E. Howard	Democratic	761	13.69
Nov 5, 2019	General	Jen Kiggans	Republican	29,609	50.36
Nov 5, 2019	General	Cheryl Turpin	Democratic	29,098	49.49
Nov 5, 2019	General	Write Ins		91	0.15
