= Virginia's 85th House of Delegates district =

Virginia legislative district

District map from the 2023 election

Virginia's 85th House of Delegates district elects one of 100 seats in the Virginia House of Delegates, the lower house of the state's bicameral legislature. District 85 represents part of Virginia Beach, including the neighborhoods of Larkspur, Aragona, Mt. Trashmore, Fairfield and Arrowhead. The seat is currently held by Marcia Price.

== Elections ==
=== 2017 ===
==== Special election ====
Outgoing delegate Scott Taylor was required to resign his seat in the House of Delegates upon his election to the United States House of Representatives in Virginia's 2nd Congressional district. A special election was held on January 10, 2017, between sheriff deputy Rocky Holcomb and local science teacher Cheryl Turpin. Holcomb defeated Turpin with 52.8% of the vote to Turpin's 47.05%.

==== General election ====
The following November, Holcomb and Turpin faced each other again during Virginia's general election. Turpin defeated Holcomb with 50.73% of the vote to Holcomb's 49.06%.

=== 2019 ===
Outgoing delegate Cheryl Turpin declined to seek reelection in order to run for Virginia's 7th Senate district. Former delegate Rocky Holcomb sought to reclaim his former seat but was defeated by Democrat Alex Askew by a margin of 51.7% to 48.3%.

== District officeholders ==
Years	Delegate	Party	Electoral history
January 12, 1983 – January 11, 1984	Julie Leonard Smith	Democratic	First delegate of district
January 11, 1984 – January 8, 2014	Bob Tata	Republican	Declined to run for re-election
January 8, 2014 – January 3, 2017	Scott Taylor	Republican	Resigned; Elected to the US House of Representatives
January 11, 2017 – January 10, 2018	Rocky Holcomb	Republican	Elected via special election; Defeated in bid for re-election
January 10, 2018 – January 8, 2020	Cheryl Turpin	Democratic	Declined to run for re-election; Defeated in bid for Virginia's 7th Senate district
January 8, 2020 – January 12, 2022	Alex Askew	Democratic	Lost re-election bid
January 12, 2022 – January 10, 2024	Karen Greenhalgh	Republican	First elected in 2021. Redistricted to the 97th district where she lost reelection.
January 10, 2024 – present	Marcia Price	Democratic	First elected in 2023. Redistricted from the 95th district.
