= Larkspur =

Larkspur may refer to:

== Botany ==
- Consolida, a genus of 40 annual flowering plants
- Delphinium, a genus of 300 perennial flowering plants

== Locations ==
- Larkspur, Alberta, Canada
- Larkspur, Edmonton, Alberta, Canada
- Larkspur, California, US
  - Larkspur Landing, the city's ferry terminal
- Larkspur, Colorado, US
- Larkspur, Virginia, US
- Larkspur, Faisalabad, Pakistan

== Other uses ==
- Larkspur (horse), the winner of the 1962 Epsom Derby
- Larkspur, a RORO ferry built in Germany, launched in 1976
- Larkspur Press, an American letter-press publisher
- Larkspur radio system, used by the British Army
- Project Larkspur, a proposed American nuclear testing program in Alaska
