= 2005 Virginia lieutenant gubernatorial election =

- November 8, 2005
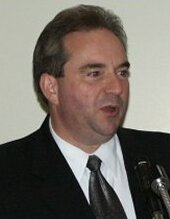

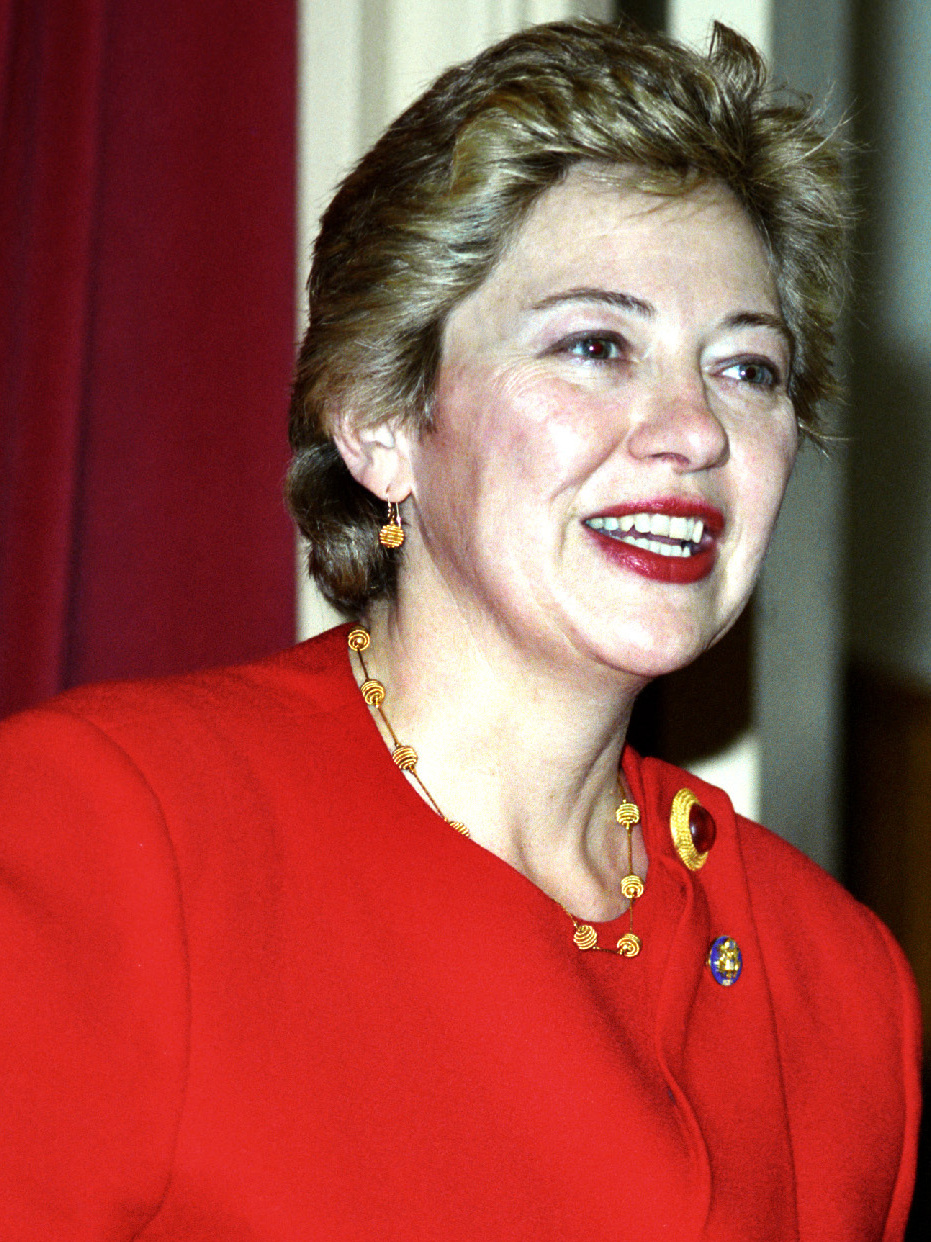
| Nominee | Bill Bolling | Leslie Byrne |
| Party | Republican | Democratic |
| Popular vote | 979,265 | 956,906 |
| Percentage | 50.5% | 49.3% |
- Bolling: 50–60% 60–70% 70–80% Byrne: 50–60% 60–70% 70–80% 80–90%
Lieutenant-Governor before election
Tim Kaine
Democratic
Elected Lieutenant-Governor
Bill Bolling
Republican

The 2005 Virginia lieutenant gubernatorial election was held on November 8, 2005, to elect the Lieutenant Governor of Virginia. Republican nominee Bill Bolling narrowly defeated Democrat Leslie Byrne despite incumbent Lieutenant Governor Tim Kaine's victory in the concurrent gubernatorial election.

== Democratic primary ==
=== Candidates ===
==== Nominee ====
- Leslie Byrne, State Senator for the 34th District (2000–2004) and U.S. Representative for Virginia's 11th congressional district (1993–1995)

==== Defeated in primary ====
- Viola Baskerville, Delegate for the 71st District (1998–2005)
- Chap Petersen, Delegate for the 37th District (2002–2006)
- Phillip Puckett, State Senator for the 38th District (1998–2014)

=== Endorsements ===
Leslie Byrne

Organizations

- Communications Workers of America

=== Results ===
Democratic primary results
| Party | Candidate | Votes | % |
|---|---|---|---|
| Democratic | Leslie Byrne | 37,904 | 32.9% |
| Democratic | Viola Baskerville | 30,083 | 26.1% |
| Democratic | Chap Petersen | 24,992 | 21.7% |
| Democratic | Phillip Puckett | 22,400 | 19.4% |
| Total votes | | 115,379 | 100.00% |

== Republican primary ==
=== Candidates ===
==== Nominee ====
- Bill Bolling, State Senator for the 4th District (1996–2005)

==== Eliminated in primary ====
- Sean Connaughton, Chair of the Prince William Board of County Supervisors (2000–2006)

=== Results ===
Republican primary results
| Party | Candidate | Votes | % |
|---|---|---|---|
| Republican | Bill Bolling | 98,941 | 58.2% |
| Republican | Sean Connaughton | 71,166 | 41.8% |
| Total votes | | 170,107 | 100.00% |

== General election ==
=== Candidates ===
- Leslie Byrne (Democratic), State Senator for the 34th District (2000–2004) and U.S. Representative for Virginia's 11th congressional district (1993–1995)
- Bill Bolling (Republican), State Senator for the 4th District (1996–2005)

=== Results ===
Virginia lieutenant gubernatorial election, 2005
| Party | Candidate | Votes | % | ±% |
|---|---|---|---|---|
| Republican | Bill Bolling | 979,265 | 50.5% | |
| Democratic | Leslie Byrne | 956,906 | 49.3% | |
| Write-ins | | 4065 | 0.2% | |
| Turnout | | 1,940,236 | | |
| Republican gain from Democratic | | Swing | | |
