= Karen Greenhalgh =

American politician from Virginia

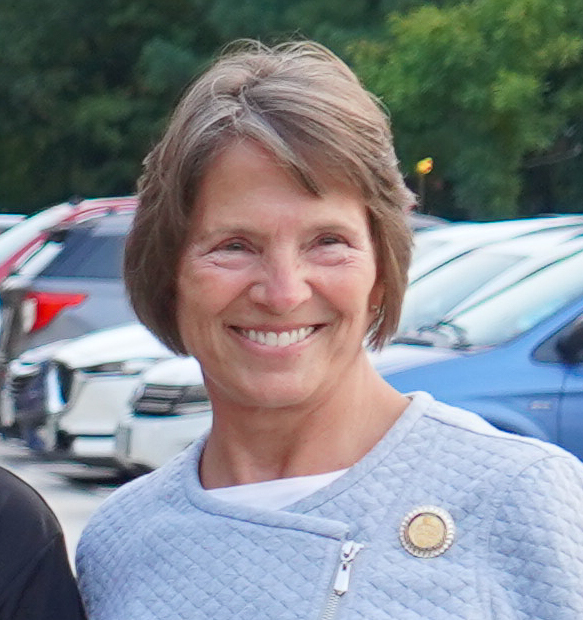
- Greenhalgh in 2023

Member of the Virginia House of Delegates from the 85th district
- In office January 12, 2022 – January 10, 2024
- Preceded by: Alex Askew
- Succeeded by: Marcia Price (redistricting)

Personal details
- Party: Republican

Karen Starling Greenhalgh is an American politician who represented the 85th district in the Virginia House of Delegates from 2022 to 2024. She is a Republican.

In the 2023 Virginia House of Delegates election, she was redistricted to the 97th district but was unseated by Democrat Michael Feggans.

== See also ==
Virginia House of Delegates
Preceded by Alex Askew	Member of the Virginia House of Delegates from the 85th district 2022–2024	Succeeded by Cia Price
