= Mamye BaCote =

American politician (1939–2020)

Mamye E. BaCote

Member of the Virginia House of Delegates from the 95th district
- In office January 14, 2004 – January 13, 2016
- Preceded by: Flora D. Crittenden
- Succeeded by: Marcia Price

Personal details
- Born: Mayme Edmondson; February 18, 1939 Halifax, Virginia, U.S.
- Died: December 14, 2020 (aged 81) Newport News, Virginia, U.S.
- Party: Democratic
- Spouse(s): Theodore Edward BaCote, Jr.
- Education: Virginia Union University; Hampton Institute
- Profession: University professor

Mamye Edmondson BaCote (February 18, 1939 – December 14, 2020) was an American politician of the Democratic Party. She was a member of the Virginia House of Delegates, representing the 95th District from 2004 to 2016.

== Background ==
BaCote was born in Halifax, Virginia. She had five sisters and one brother. She received her bachelor's degree from Virginia Union University, in 1960, and her master's degree from Hampton Institute in 1967. BaCote taught in the Newport News Public School System for many years. She first taught at Huntington High School and after the schools became integrated she moved to Menchville High School where she eventually became the department head. BaCote was a university professor. She served on the Newport News City Council from 1996 to 2003.

== House of Delegates ==
BaCote was first elected to the Virginia House of Delegates in 2003 after delegate Flora D. Crittenden announced her retirement from representing the 95th House of Delegates district. BaCote ran with state Sen. Mamie Locke and they called themselves the M&M team because they handed out M&M's to voters during their campaign. In 2007 the theme of her campaign was the support of funding and proposed policies for public education and higher education, health care, transportation and public safety. In 2011 she defeated her opponent from the liberal party; Glenn McGuire in the November 8th general election. In the year of 2013 she was endorsed by the LGBT Democrats of Virginia and Virginia Association of Relators. BaCote served until 2015. Assigned to the House Appropriations committee, BaCote secured funding for the Newport News Drug Court, thus offering participants the opportunity to stay out of jail through intense rehabilitation efforts.

== Death ==
BaCote died on December 14, 2020, in Newport News, Virginia.

== Notes ==
Virginia House of Delegates
Preceded by Flora D. Crittenden	Virginia Delegate for District 95; 2004–2016	Succeeded by Marcia Price
