= Edwin H. Ragsdale =

American real estate developer and politician

Member of the Virginia House of Delegates
- In office January 12, 1983 – January 11, 1984
- Preceded by: George W. Grayson
- Succeeded by: George W. Grayson
- Constituency: 97th district
- In office January 12, 1972 – January 14, 1976
- Succeeded by: Robinson B. James
- Constituency: 34th district

Personal details
- Born: Edwin Harris Ragsdale; December 18, 1929 DeWitt, Virginia, U.S.
- Died: September 13, 2017 (aged 87) Richmond, Virginia, U.S.
- Party: Republican
- Spouse: Juanita Helfert

Edwin Harris Ragsdale (December 18, 1929 – September 13, 2017) was an American real estate developer and Republican politician from Virginia. After serving as Chairman of the Henrico County Board of Supervisors, he was elected to two terms in the Virginia House of Delegates, serving from 1972 to 1976. He ran again in 1982, defeating Delegate George W. Grayson but was bested in a rematch the next year.
