= Chris Peace =

American politician (born 1976)

Member of the Virginia House of Delegates from the 97th district
- In office January 25, 2006 – January 8, 2020
- Preceded by: Ryan McDougle
- Succeeded by: Scott Wyatt

Personal details
- Born: Christopher Kilian Peace; November 16, 1976 (age 49) Richmond, Virginia, U.S.
- Party: Republican
- Spouse: Ashley Hopkins
- Children: 2
- Education: Hampden-Sydney College; University of Richmond
- Profession: Lawyer
- Committees: Appropriations; General Laws; Health, Welfare and Institutions;
- Website: www.chrispeace.com

Christopher Kilian Peace (born November 16, 1976) is an American politician. He is a member of the Republican Party.

From 2006–2019 Peace was a member of the Virginia House of Delegates. He represented the 97th district in the Middle Peninsula, made up of New Kent County and parts of Hanover County and King William. Peace served on the prominent Appropriations, Health Welfare and Institutions, and General Laws Committees. He served as Vice-chair of the General Laws Committee, Chair of the General Laws Sub-committee on Housing, and Chair of the Appropriations Sub-committee on Transportation.

== Early life ==
Peace was born in Richmond, Virginia, on November 16, 1976. Peace graduated from St. Christopher's School, received a Bachelor of Arts degree in English from Hampden-Sydney College and earned his J.D. degree from the University of Richmond.

He is an alumnus of Leadership Metro Richmond and the University of Virginia’s Sorensen Institute for Political Leadership.

== Early career ==
Prior to his public service in the legislature, Peace worked at McGuire Woods Consulting, a national public affairs and public relations firm. He began his public affairs career by working as a legislative aide in the Virginia House of Delegates and as a law clerk for the Richmond City Attorney and Virginia Attorney General.

Currently Peace owns his own law firm and is an active member of the Virginia State Bar and the bar association of the District of Columbia. He has taught legal studies as an adjunct professor of legal studies at Virginia Commonwealth University’s Wilder School of Government and Public Affairs.

== Positions and appointments ==
Peace served as the executive director of Historic Polegreen Church Foundation, a historic preservation non-profit foundation, and established the Road to Revolution State Heritage Trail to honor the life and influence of Virginia’s first governor, Patrick Henry. Peace served as Chairman of the Virginia Commission on Youth, Vice-chairman of the Virginia Indian Commemorative Commission, member of the Commonwealth's Council for Childhood Success, and was a member of the Virginia Bicentennial of the American War of 1812 Commission.

== Awards and recognition ==
In 2005, Style Weekly magazine named Peace one of the “Top 40 Under 40.”

Sorensen presented Peace its 2008 alumni award for “Expression of Ideals.”

== See also ==
- List of Hampden–Sydney College alumni
