= Jen Kiggans =

American politician and nurse (born 1971)

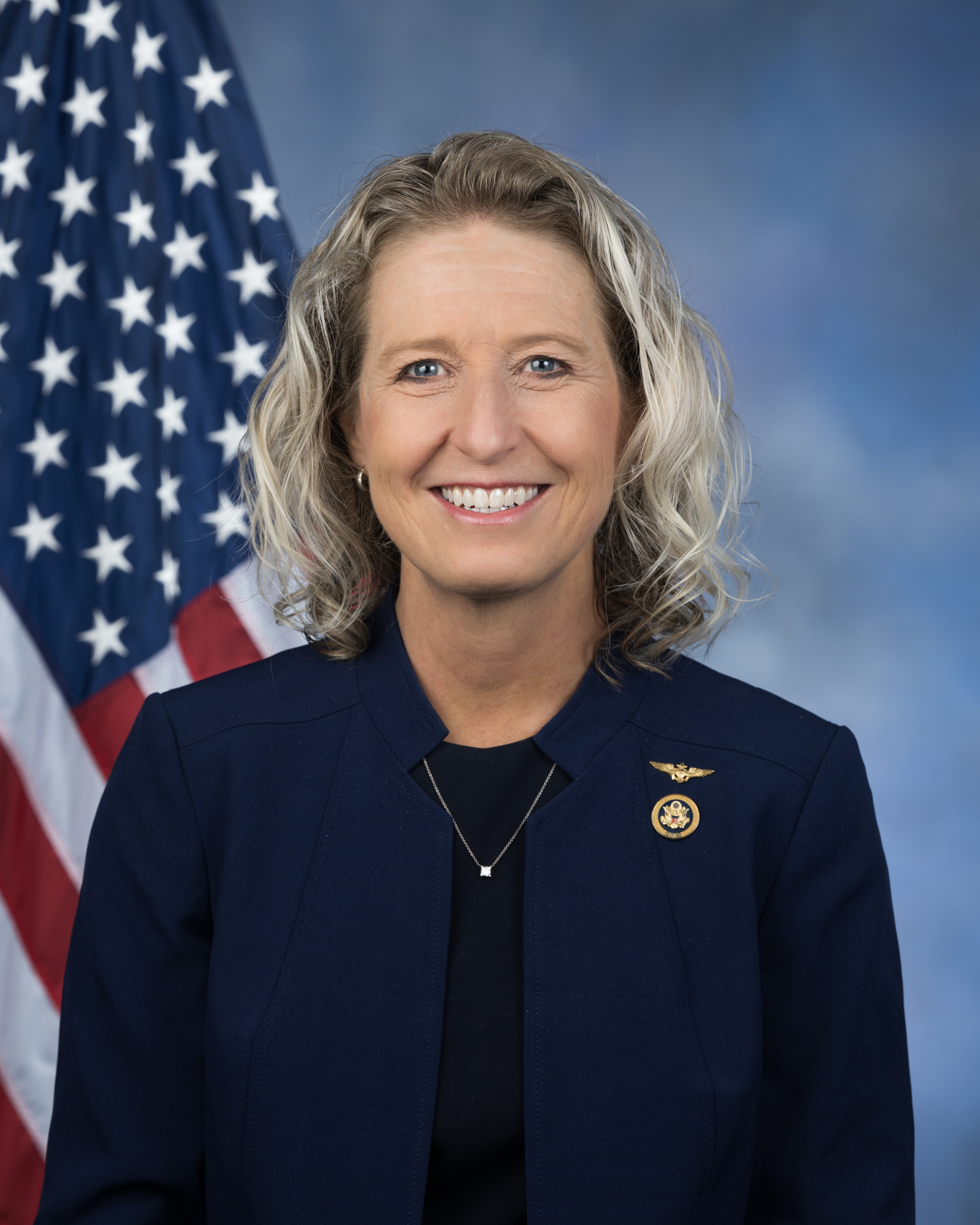
- Official portrait, 2024

Member of the U.S. House of Representatives from Virginia's 2nd district
- Incumbent
- Assumed office January 3, 2023
- Preceded by: Elaine Luria

Member of the Virginia Senate from the 7th district
- In office January 8, 2020 – November 15, 2022
- Preceded by: Frank Wagner
- Succeeded by: Aaron Rouse

Personal details
- Born: Jennifer Ann Moore; June 18, 1971 (age 55) Tampa, Florida, U.S.
- Party: Republican
- Spouse: Steve Kiggans (m. 1999)
- Children: 4
- Education: Boston University (BA); Old Dominion University (BSN); Vanderbilt University (MSN)
- Website: House website Campaign website

Military service
- Allegiance: United States
- Branch/service: United States Navy
- Years of service: 1993–2003
- Unit: Naval Aviator
- Battles/wars: Iraq War; Kosovo War

Jennifer Ann Kiggans (née Moore; born June 18, 1971) is an American politician, former United States Navy helicopter pilot, and geriatric nurse practitioner serving as the U.S. representative for Virginia's 2nd congressional district since 2023. A member of the Republican Party, she previously served in the Virginia Senate from 2020 to 2022.

Kiggans was first elected to the House in 2022, defeating Democratic incumbent Elaine Luria. She was re-elected in 2024. Kiggans lost in a rematch to Luria in 2026, Kiggans will leave office on January 3, 2027.

== Early life and career ==
Kiggans was born in Tampa, Florida, and graduated from high school in Orlando, Florida. As a high school student, she worked at Walt Disney World. She is an alumna of Boston University. In 1993 and 1994, she taught English in Japan through the JET Programme. She also lived in Japan as a Navy spouse for five years.

Kiggans joined the United States Navy in 1993 and was a Navy pilot for ten years, flying H-46 and H-3 helicopters.

After serving in the military, Kiggans attended nursing school at Old Dominion University and Vanderbilt University School of Nursing. She is an adult geriatric nurse practitioner at Eastern Virginia Medical School and in private practice.

== Early political career ==
In 2019, Kiggans ran for the Virginia Senate for the 7th district, which was being vacated by Republican incumbent Frank Wagner. In the Republican Party primary, Kiggans defeated Virginia Beach School Board member Carolyn Weems, 52% to 48%.

In the general election, Kiggans faced Democratic state Delegate Cheryl Turpin. The race was viewed as competitive, as the district had very narrowly favored Democrats in recent statewide elections. Kiggans and Turpin each spent over $500,000 on television advertisements. Kiggans won, 50.4% to 49.5%.

The Washington Post reported that "Her record didn't always fit neatly along a party line." She voted to expand nondiscrimination protections for LGBTQ people and for environmental protection measures.

In 2022, Kiggans introduced a bill to prohibit transgender girls from playing girls' sports and voted for an audit of the 2020 election.

== U.S. House of Representatives ==
=== Elections ===
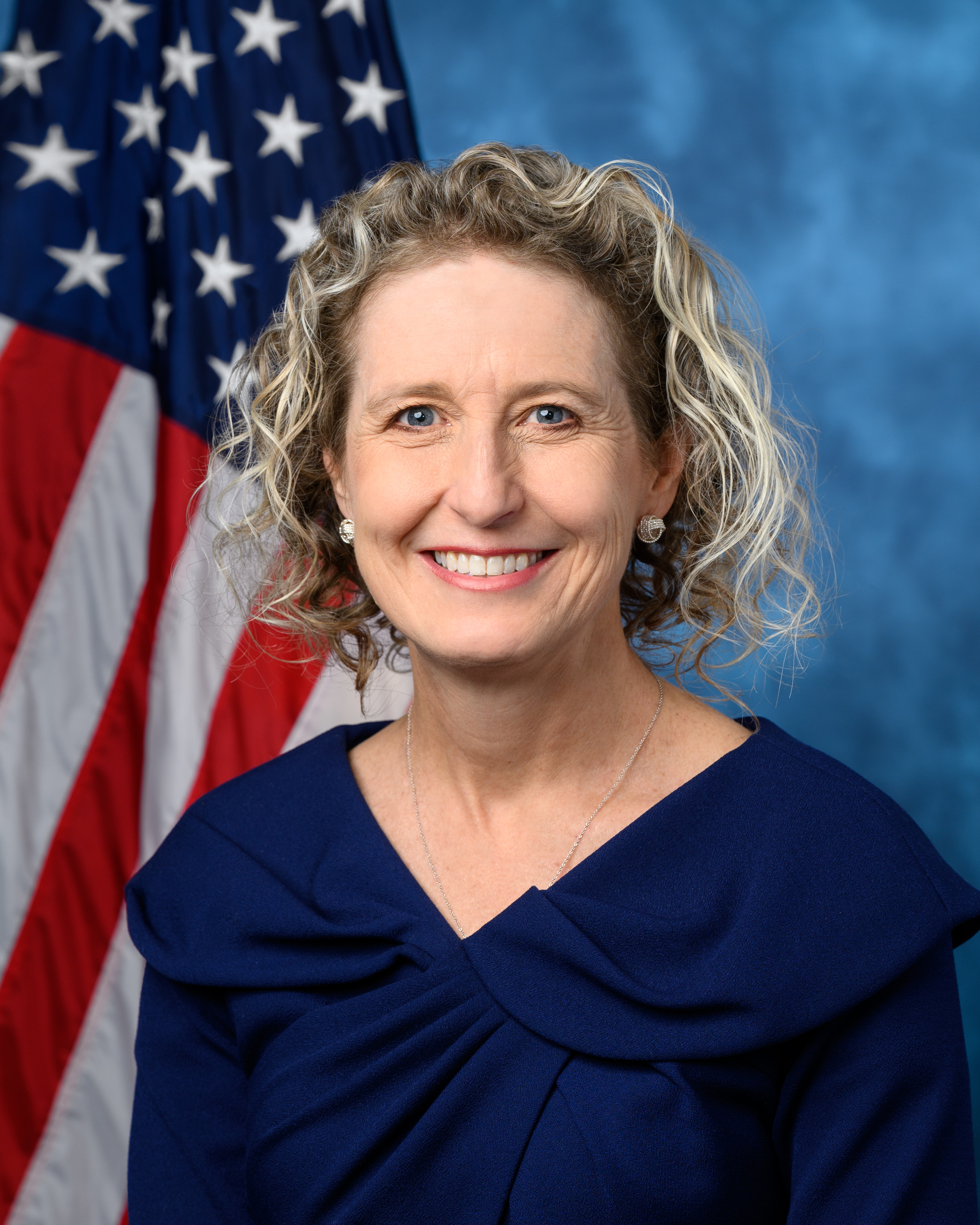
Kiggans in 2022

==== 2022 ====
Kiggans announced on April 12, 2021, that she was running for Virginia's 2nd congressional district to challenge Democratic incumbent Elaine Luria in the 2022 election. Virginia's 2nd district—redrawn after the 2020 census—contains Chesapeake, the Eastern Shore, Isle of Wight, Southampton County, Suffolk County, and Virginia Beach.

Kiggans secured her party's nomination on June 21, 2022, after defeating Jarome Bell in the Republican primary with 56% of the vote. She campaigned on issues regarding the economy and inflation, as well as transgenderism and the parental rights movement.

The Cook Political Report rated the election as a "tossup" by November 7, 2022. Kiggans defeated Luria in the November general election—a race viewed as critical for the Republican Party to regain its House majority in the 2022 midterms.

==== 2024 ====
Kiggans announced on January 7, 2024, that she would run for reelection in the 2024 election—a race targeted by the Democratic Congressional Campaign Committee. In June 2024, she participated in a rally with former president Donald Trump and incumbent governor Glenn Youngkin in Chesapeake after the first presidential debate.

Kiggans faced Democratic nominee Missy Cotter Smasal, a fellow Navy veteran. Kiggans campaigned on support for a Mexico–United States border wall and lowering inflation occurring under the Biden administration. The Cook Political Report rated the election as "Lean Republican" by November 1, 2024. Kiggans defeated Smasal by a 4-point margin in the general election, larger than her 3-point margin in the 2022 election.

==== 2026 ====
Kiggans sought reelection in 2026, facing Luria in a rematch.

Luria unseated Kiggans 53% to 44%.

=== Caucus memberships ===
- Congressional Wildlife Refuge Caucus
- Republican Main Street Partnership
- Republican Governance Group

== Political positions ==
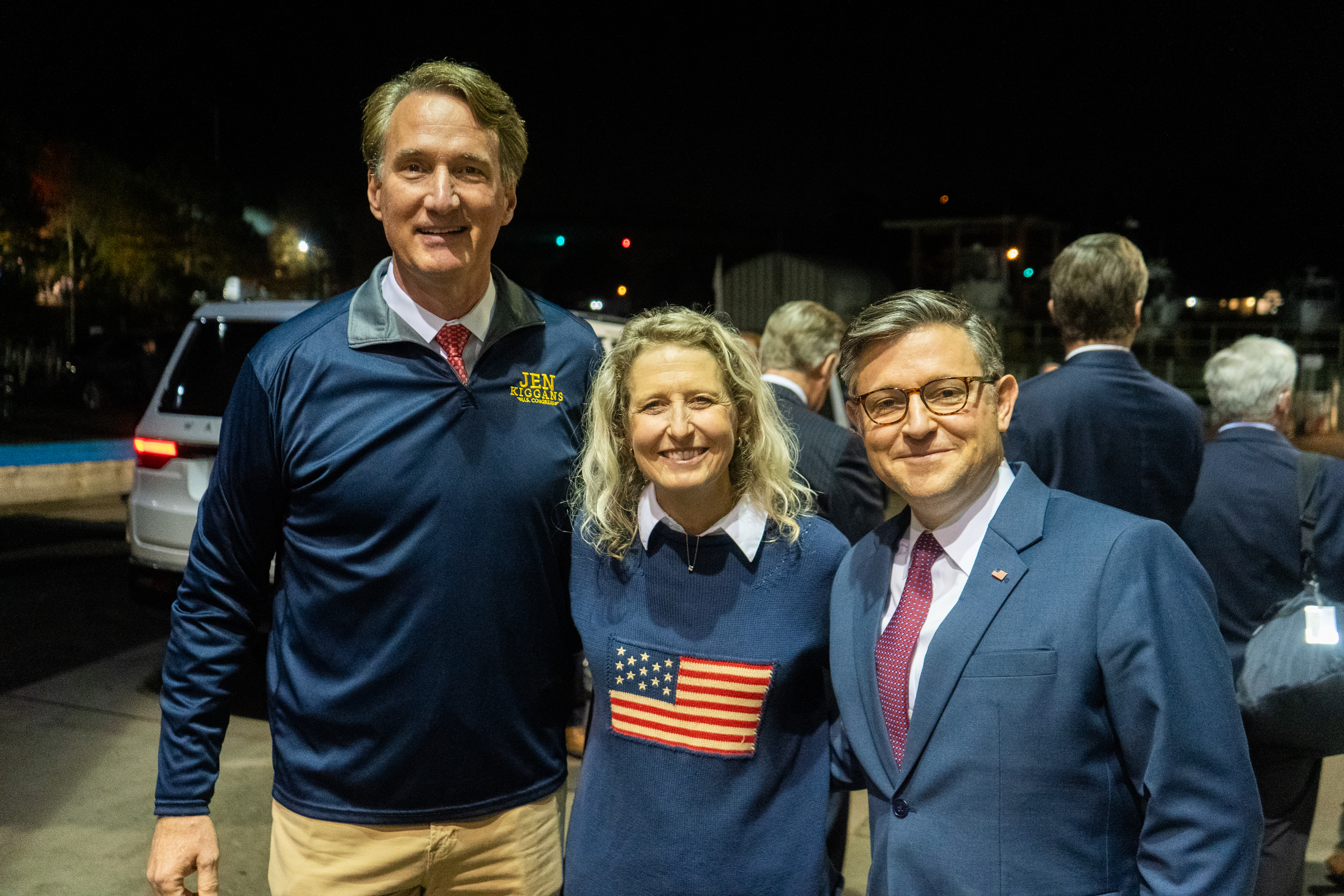
Kiggans (center) with Governor Glenn Youngkin and Speaker Mike Johnson the night before the 2024 elections

=== Budget and taxes ===
In May 2025, Kiggans voted for the One Big Beautiful Bill Act.

Kiggans advocated to maintain appropriated funds for NASA's Wallops Flight Facility and Langley Research Center in the 2026 federal budget. She argues that these locations are "prized possession for the Commonwealth" and that "the work that's going on there from the defense side, but also on the private industry side, [...] with places like Rocket Lab and Firefly, and Northrop Grumman is there."

=== Foreign and military policy ===
Kiggans opposes cuts to funding in the Military Construction, Veteran Affairs, and Related Agencies Appropriations Act and supports improving military housing which she has described as, "in disrepair and unlivable".

In 2023, Kiggans was one of 18 Republicans who voted against Jim Jordan's nomination for Speaker of the House all three times. According to Kiggans, Jordan did not grant assurances he wouldn't cut the defense budget.

==== 2026 Iran war ====
Kiggans has strongly supported the Trump administration in the 2026 Iran war, also known as Operation Epic Fury. Kiggans stated in March 2026 that the goals of the war include "destroying Iran's ballistic missile capability, destroying their navy, and destroying their ability to have nuclear weapons." In June 2026, Kiggans voted against a war powers resolution that would have limited the president's ability to wage war in Iran without congressional consent.

=== Healthcare ===
Kiggans voted against extending Affordable Care Act subsidies in December 2025.

Kiggans supports banning abortions after fifteen weeks of pregnancy, except for in cases of rape, incest, or to protect the life of the mother. In June 2022, she expressed support for the U.S. Supreme Court's ruling in Dobbs v. Jackson Women's Health Organization, which overruled Roe v. Wade.

=== Other ===
According to The Washington Post, Kiggans "has never beat a 'stolen election' drum", but has hesitated to acknowledge Joe Biden as a legitimate president. She called for a forensic audit of Virginia's 2020 presidential election results; a previous audit of those results found no evidence of fraud. She has said that she does not believe the FBI search of Mar-a-Lago was justified.

== Personal life ==
Kiggans is a lifelong Roman Catholic. She has been married since 1999 to Steve Kiggans, a retired Navy F-18 pilot. They have four children. Kiggans' father is also a veteran, serving in the Vietnam War as an Army Green Beret.

== Electoral history ==
=== U.S. House of Representatives ===
==== 2022 ====
2022 Virginia's 2nd congressional district election
Primary election
Party	Candidate	Votes	%
Republican	Jen Kiggans	23,300	55.69
Republican	Jarome Bell	11,330	27.08
Republican	Thomas Altman	5,972	14.27
Republican	Andrew Baan	1,237	2.96
Total votes		41,839	100.00
General election
Republican	Jen Kiggans	153,328	51.63
Democratic	Elaine Luria (incumbent)	143,219	48.22
Write-in		442	0.15
Total votes		296,989	100.00

==== 2024 ====
2024 Virginia's 2nd congressional district election
Party	Candidate	Votes	%
Republican	Jen Kiggans (incumbent)	207,368	50.74
Democratic	Missy Cotter Smasal	191,666	46.89
Independent	Robert Reid Jr.	9,197	2.25
Write-in		471	0.12
Total votes		408,702	100.00

U.S. House of Representatives
Preceded by Elaine Luria	Member of the U.S. House of Representatives from Virginia's 2nd congressional district 2023–present	Incumbent
U.S. order of precedence (ceremonial)
Preceded by Thomas Kean Jr.	United States representatives by seniority 322nd	Succeeded by Kevin Kiley
