= Elmo Cross =

American lawyer and politician

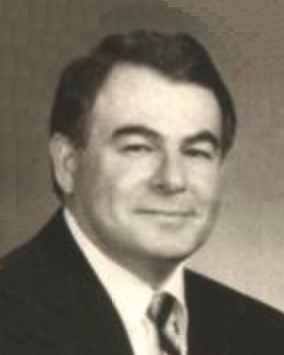

Member of the Virginia Senate from the 4th district
- In office January 14, 1976 – January 10, 1996
- Preceded by: Leslie D. Campbell Jr.
- Succeeded by: Bill Bolling

Personal details
- Born: Elmo Garnett Cross Jr. February 19, 1942 (age 84) Richmond, Virginia, U.S.
- Party: Democratic
- Spouse: Anne
- Education: University of Richmond

Elmo Garnett Cross Jr. (born February 19, 1942) is an American lawyer and politician who served for 20 years as a member of the Senate of Virginia. He was defeated for reelection in the 1995 Virginia Senate election by Bill Bolling. At the time, Cross was chair of the Senate's Agriculture Committee.
