= Bill Bolling =

American businessman and politician

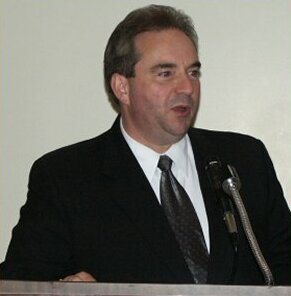
- Bolling in 2003

39th Lieutenant Governor of Virginia
- In office January 14, 2006 – January 11, 2014
- Governor: Tim Kaine; Bob McDonnell
- Preceded by: Tim Kaine
- Succeeded by: Ralph Northam

50th Chair of the National Lieutenant Governors Association
- In office 2009–2010
- Preceded by: Barbara Lawton
- Succeeded by: Anthony Brown

Member of the Virginia Senate from the 4th district
- In office January 10, 1996 – November 29, 2005
- Preceded by: Elmo Cross
- Succeeded by: Ryan McDougle

Personal details
- Born: William Troy Bolling; June 15, 1957 (age 69) Sistersville, West Virginia, U.S.
- Party: Republican
- Spouse: Jean Kincaid (m. 1978)
- Education: University of Charleston (BS)

William Troy Bolling (born June 15, 1957) is an American businessman, politician and educator who served as the 39th Lieutenant Governor of Virginia from 2006 to 2014.

A member of the Republican party, he was elected twice to the position by defeating his Democratic opponent in both the 2005 and 2009 general elections. He was the first lieutenant governor in the Commonwealth of Virginia to serve two consecutive terms since Don Beyer. He was succeeded by Democrat Ralph Northam after the 2013 general election.

== Early life, education, and early career ==
Bolling was born on June 15, 1957, in Sistersville, West Virginia. He was raised in the coal fields of southwest Virginia and southern West Virginia. His father was a surface coal miner, and his mother was a homemaker. As a 15-year-old, he volunteered to work on the re-election campaign of Republican Governor of West Virginia Arch Moore. He graduated from the University of Charleston (West Virginia) in 1978 with a B.S. degree in Political Science and was the first member of his family to graduate from college. He moved to Mechanicsville, Virginia, in 1981 when he accepted a job with a Virginia insurance company.

== Political career ==
=== Hanover County Board of Supervisors ===
Bolling first ran for elected office in 1991 for a position on the Hanover County Board of Supervisors. Bolling won that office and served as a member of the Board until 1995. While a member, Bolling also served as the Chairman of the Board of Supervisors.

=== Virginia Senate ===
In 1995, Bolling was elected to the Senate of Virginia in a highly contested race against twenty-year Democratic incumbent Elmo G. Cross, Jr., for the 4th Senate District seat. Bolling defeated Cross by 574 votes out of 50,000 cast. The district then included Caroline, Essex, Hanover, King and Queen, King William, Middlesex, counties, as well as a part of Spotsylvania County. However, this district had been trending Republican for some time at the national level. Proving this, Bolling was unopposed for reelection in 1999 and 2003.

As a member of the General Assembly, Bolling served as Chairman of the Joint Republican Caucus, the Virginia Republican Senatorial Committee, Chairman of the Senate's subcommittee on Health Care, the Commission on the Future of Virginia's Environment, and the Chesapeake Bay Commission.

== Lieutenant Governor of Virginia ==
=== Elections ===
In 2005, Bolling ran for the office of Lieutenant Governor of Virginia. In the Republican primary, he defeated Sean Connaughton with 58% of the vote.

In the general election, he defeated Democratic nominee and state Senator Leslie Larkin Byrne 50%-49%. He won even though the Republican nominee for governor Jerry Kilgore lost the gubernatorial election.

In 2009, Bolling ran for re-election. He defeated Democratic nominee Jody Wagner with 57% of the vote.

=== Tenure ===
==== Kaine administration ====
Bolling was inaugurated as lieutenant governor on January 14, 2006, in Williamsburg, Virginia, along with the other Executive Branch officers, including Democratic Governor Tim Kaine and Attorney General Bob McDonnell. Upon his re-election in 2009, Bolling became the first Virginia lieutenant governor since Don Beyer to be elected to two consecutive terms.

As lieutenant governor, Bolling promoted multiple programs, including his September program focused on encouraging a healthy and active life, his Ending Cervical Cancer in our Lifetime program focused on raising awareness about Cervical Cancer and HPV, and his Helping Virginians Breathe Easier campaign focused on asthma awareness.

Additionally, as lieutenant governor, Bolling proposed a statewide initiative, "100 Ideas for the Future of Virginia." This two-year program focused on gathering public feedback and ideas through a series of town hall meetings, mailings, and an integrated website. This program focused on promoting feedback from the people of Virginia to develop a long-term strategy for addressing issues like education, transportation, public safety, health care, protecting the environment, reforming government, and more.

==== McDonnell administration ====
Bolling was one of the newly elected Governor McDonnell's first cabinet members, and was appointed as Chief Jobs Creation Officer, overseeing the state’s economic development programs. Regarding creation of the position, McDonnell stated, "I'm going to turn him into the busiest lieutenant governor in the nation."

In March 2010, Bolling announced, on behalf of Governor McDonnell, $10 million in rebates for home owners and small businesses to reduce energy costs and to increase usage of solar and wind energy. In June 2010, Bolling announced $800,000 from the Virginia government to James Madison University to further research in wind energy, including "turbine testing, research and curriculum"

== 2013 gubernatorial campaign ==
In early 2008, Bolling and then-Attorney General McDonnell struck a deal in which Bolling agreed to run for re-election as lieutenant governor to allow McDonnell to run unopposed for governor in 2009, in exchange for McDonnell's support for Bolling for governor in 2013. The deal was widely known and as such, Bolling was effectively running for governor since 2009, and in April 2010, Bolling filed the necessary paperwork to run in 2013. Virginia Attorney General Ken Cuccinelli, elected alongside McDonnell and Bolling in 2009, stated that he intended to run for re-election as attorney general in 2013, but did not rule out running for governor. In December 2011, Cuccinelli announced to his staff that he would run against Bolling for governor in 2013; the news went public, and in response, Bolling issued a statement accusing Cuccinelli of putting "his own personal ambition ahead of the best interests of the commonwealth and the Republican Party." Cuccinelli's announcement came two days before the annual statewide conference of Virginia Republicans, at which Bolling and his staff expressed being upset with Cuccinelli's decision.

In 2012, Bolling was the Virginia state Chairman of Mitt Romney's 2012 presidential campaign, a position he hoped to use to curry favor from a potential Romney administration and increase his own name recognition among state Republicans. Through the second quarter of 2012, Bolling had a significant edge in fundraising over Cuccinelli. However, Bolling's hopes of becoming the Republican nominee were dealt a serious setback in June 2012 when the Republican Party of Virginia's State Central Committee decided to nominate candidates for statewide office in a closed party convention, rather than an open statewide primary. It was felt that a convention would favor Cuccinelli because Republican conventions in Virginia are typically dominated by conservatives, who backed Cuccinelli over the more moderate Bolling.

On November 28, 2012, Bolling announced that he was suspending his campaign. He said that "the decision to change the method of nomination from a primary to a convention created too many obstacles for us to overcome", and that he didn't want to "create deep divisions within our party." He refused to endorse Cuccinelli, saying, "I have serious reservations about his ability to effectively and responsibly lead our state."

After suspending his campaign for the Republican nomination, Bolling considered running as an independent, but decided against it. Bolling also rejected the possibility of a write-in effort, citing an inability to raise enough money to run a successful campaign. However, Bolling continued to comment on the race and the policy proposals of both the Democratic nominee, Terry McAuliffe, and the Republican nominee, Ken Cuccinelli. During the campaign, McAuliffe informally offered Bolling a position in his administration, but Bolling was ultimately never appointed.

== Electoral history ==
Virginia Lieutenant Governor Election, 2009
Party	Candidate	Votes	%
Republican	Bill Bolling (incumbent)	1,106,793	56.51
Democratic	Jody Wagner	850,111	43.40
Independent	Write-in candidates	1,569	0.08
Total votes		1,958,473	100

Virginia Lieutenant Governor Election, 2005
Party	Candidate	Votes	%
Republican	Bill Bolling	979,265	50.47
Democratic	Leslie L. Byrne	956,906	49.32
Independent	Write-in candidates	4,065	0.21
Total votes		1,940,236	100

Virginia Senate General Election, 2003
Party	Candidate	Votes	%
Republican	Bill Bolling (incumbent)	27,646	99.44
Independent	Write-in candidates	155	0.66
Total votes		27,801	100

Virginia Senate General Election, 1999
Party	Candidate	Votes	%
Republican	Bill Bolling (incumbent)	38,136	99.69
Independent	Write-in candidates	117	0.31
Total votes		38,253	100

Virginia Senate General Election, 1995
Party	Candidate	Votes	%
Republican	Bill Bolling	26,957	50.54
Democratic	Elmo G. Cross, Jr. (incumbent)	26,383	49.46
Independent	Write-in candidates	2	0.00
Total votes		53,342	100

== Business career ==
Professionally, Bolling spent his entire career in the insurance business. He served as a Vice President with Riggs, Counselman, Michaels and Downes, one of the nation’s independent insurance agencies, but took a leave of absence from the firm in 2018 to pursue a career in teaching.

In October 2018, Bolling accepted an appointment as a Senior Fellow at James Madison University, where he did extensive guest lecturing in political science and served as an advisor to the president of the university. Bolling finished his fellowship at JMU in June 2019 and returned to his home in Richmond.

As of 2025, Bolling teaches political science at George Mason University, Virginia Commonwealth University, and the University of Richmond.

== Personal life ==
On August 6, 1978, Bolling married Jean Ann Kincaid, whom he met in college. They have two sons. Matthew Bolling received a degree in computer engineering from Virginia Tech in 2006. Kevin Bolling graduated with a degree in Business from James Madison University in 2010.

Senate of Virginia
Preceded by Elmo Cross	Member of the Virginia Senate from the 4th district 1996–2005	Succeeded by Ryan McDougle
Political offices
Preceded by Tim Kaine	Lieutenant Governor of Virginia; 2006–2014	Succeeded by Ralph Northam
