= Leslie D. Campbell Jr. =

American lawyer and politician (1925–2020)

Les Campbell
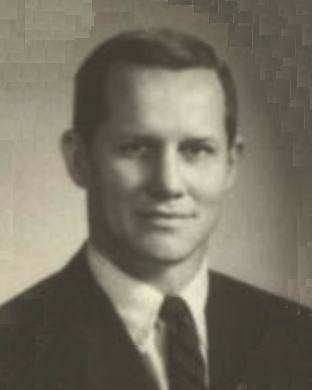

Member of the Virginia Senate
- In office January 8, 1964 – January 14, 1976
- Preceded by: Thomas H. Blanton
- Succeeded by: Elmo Cross
- Constituency: 29th district (1964‍–‍1966); 26th district (1966‍–‍1972); 4th district (1972‍–‍1976)

Commonwealth's Attorney of Hanover County
- In office January 1, 1956 – April 15, 1963
- Preceded by: Robert R. Gwathmey III
- Succeeded by: Jack Ellis

Personal details
- Born: Leslie Dunlop Campbell Jr. January 26, 1925 Hanover, Virginia, U.S.
- Died: December 26, 2020 (aged 95) Hanover, Virginia, U.S.
- Party: Democratic
- Spouse: Eleanor Dickson (m. 1959)
- Education: University of Richmond (LLB)
- Occupation: Lawyer; farmer; politician

Military service
- Branch/service: United States Navy
- Battles/wars: World War II

Leslie Dunlop Campbell Jr. (January 26, 1925 – December 26, 2020) was an American lawyer and politician who served as a member of the Virginia state senate. The former commonwealth's attorney of Hanover County, he won the nomination for Senate in 1963 against former delegate Edmund T. DeJarnette. He was defeated in a 1975 Democratic primary challenge by Elmo Cross.
