= Ed Schrock =

American politician (born 1941)

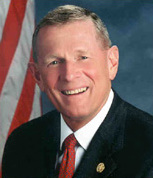

Member of the U.S. House of Representatives from Virginia's 2nd district
- In office January 3, 2001 – January 3, 2005
- Preceded by: Owen B. Pickett
- Succeeded by: Thelma Drake

Member of the Virginia Senate from the 7th district
- In office January 10, 1996 – January 3, 2001
- Preceded by: Clancy Holland
- Succeeded by: Frank Wagner

Personal details
- Born: Edward Lee Schrock; April 6, 1941 (age 85) Middletown, Ohio, U.S.
- Party: Republican
- Relations: Child: Randall M. Grandchild: Kathryn J. Grandchild: Raymond E. Grandchild: Lucy C.
- Education: Alderson Broaddus University (BA); American University (MA)

Military service
- Branch/service: United States Navy
- Years of service: 1964–1988
- Battles/wars: Vietnam War

Edward Lee Schrock (born April 6, 1941) is a retired naval officer (1964–1988) and American Republican politician who served as a member of the Senate of Virginia from 1996 to 2001. He also served in the U.S. House of Representatives from January 2001 to January 2005, representing the Second Congressional District of Virginia.

== Early life and career ==
Born in Middletown, Ohio, Schrock earned a bachelor's degree from Alderson-Broaddus College in 1964 and a master's degree in Public Relations from American University in 1975. His 24-year career as a commissioned officer in the U.S. Navy (1964 to 1988) included two tours of duty in Vietnam. After retiring from active military service, Schrock worked as an investment broker and then served in the Virginia State Senate, from 1996 to 2001.

== Tenure in Congress ==
In 2000, he was elected to the U.S. House seat for Virginia's 2nd District, defeating the Democratic Party nominee, Jody Wagner, a Norfolk attorney who later became state treasurer.

In his first term, Schrock was elected president of the Republican freshman class. During his four years in Congress, Schrock served on the Armed Services Committee, Budget Committee, Small Business Committee and Government Reform Committee.

In 2002 in his second term, Schrock defeated Green Party candidate D.C. Amarasinghe, winning 83.15% of the vote.

=== Controversy ===
In 2004, Michael Rogers's blogACTIVE.com had said that Schrock is gay — or at least bisexual — despite having aggressively opposed various gay-rights issues in Congress, such as same-sex marriage and gays serving in the military. Schrock, who is married, announced on August 30, 2004, that he would not seek a third term in Congress.

On November 2, in the general election, fellow Republican Thelma Drake was elected to replace Schrock. Drake took office in January 2005.

== After Congress ==
In December 2004, Representative Tom Davis, another Virginia Republican, hired Schrock to serve as the top staff person for one of the subcommittees of the Government Reform Committee which Davis chaired and on which Schrock had served.

Schrock was briefly covered in the 2009 documentary Outrage, which profiles allegedly closeted gay public officials who have endorsed anti-gay legislation.

== Electoral history ==
Virginia's 2nd congressional district election, 2000
Party	Candidate	Votes	%
Republican	Edward L. Schrock	97,856	51.96%
Democratic	Jody M. Wagner	90,328	47.96%
Write-in		145	0.08%
Total votes		188,329	100%
Republican gain from Democratic			

Virginia's 2nd congressional district election, 2002
Party	Candidate	Votes	%
Republican	Edward L. Schrock (Incumbent)	103,807	83.15%
Green	D. C. Amarasinghe	20,589	16.49%
Write-in		450	0.36%
Total votes		124,846	100%
Republican hold			

== See also ==
- List of federal political sex scandals in the United States

U.S. House of Representatives
Preceded by Owen B. Pickett	Member of the U.S. House of Representatives from Virginia's 2nd congressional district 2001–2005	Succeeded by Thelma Drake
U.S. order of precedence (ceremonial)
Preceded by Frank Guinta as Former U.S. Representative	Order of precedence of the United States as Former U.S. Representative	Succeeded by Thelma Drake as Former U.S. Representative
