= Bob Tata =

American politician (1930–2021)

Member of the Virginia House of Delegates from the 85th district
- In office January 11, 1984 – January 8, 2014
- Preceded by: Julie Leonard Smith
- Succeeded by: Scott W. Taylor

Personal details
- Born: January 27, 1930 Detroit, Michigan, U.S.
- Died: June 11, 2021 (aged 91) Stanardsville, Virginia, U.S.
- Party: Republican
- Spouse: Martha Jeraldine Morris
- Education: University of Virginia

Military service
- Allegiance: United States
- Branch/service: United States Army
- Years of service: 1954–1956

Robert Tata (January 27, 1930 – June 11, 2021) was an American politician. A Republican and the member of the Virginia House of Delegates from 1984 to 2014, representing the 85th district in Virginia Beach. Tata announced that he would not run for reelection in 2013.

== Early life ==
Tata was born and raised in Detroit, the son of Italian immigrants. He attended the University of Virginia, where he played varsity football and baseball. He was drafted in 1953 by the Detroit Lions of the National Football League, but was cut in training camp. He returned to Charlottesville, Virginia to complete his B.S. degree in education and met his future wife, Martha Jeraldine "Jerry" Morris, while doing his student teaching. Tata served in the United States Army 1954–1956. He and his wife then moved to Norfolk, Virginia, where they both took school jobs. Tata later received an M.S. degree in guidance and counseling from the University of Virginia.

== Coaching career ==
Bob Tata
Coaching career (HC unless noted)
- 1956–1957: Norfolk Catholic HS (VA)
- 1963: Apprentice
- 1965: NGranby HS (VA)
- 1967–1979: Norview HS (VA)

Head coaching record
- Overall: 3–3–2 (college)

Tata spent about 30 years as a teacher and guidance counselor in the Hampton Roads area; he spent a number of those years serving as a football coach at the schools where he worked. At his first stop, Norfolk Catholic High School, his teams were 8–81 in the 1956 and 1957 seasons. Tata was the 19th head football coach at The Apprentice School in Newport News, Virginia and he held that position for the 1963 season. His coaching record at Apprentice was 3–3–2.

In 1965, his only year as head coach at Granby High School, the team went 10−1, losing only the state championship game. He then coached at Norview High School 1967 to 1979, winning six district championships with an overall record of 101−32−2.

== Personal life and death ==
Tata taught for 40 years, and served for four years on the Virginia Beach School Board. The Tatas had two sons and a daughter. Robert M. Tata attended the United States Naval Academy; he became a captain in the United States Naval Reserve, and a lawyer. Anthony J. Tata, a West Point graduate, rose to the rank of brigadier general in the United States Army and is a novelist. Kendall Tata went to the University of Virginia and James Madison University, and became a Virginia Beach high school teacher and track coach. Tata died on June 11, 2021, in Stanardsville, Virginia.
