= Rocky Holcomb =

American politician (born 1968)

Sheriff of Virginia Beach
- Incumbent
- Assumed office September 29, 2023
- Preceded by: Ken Stolle

Member of the Virginia Beach City Council from the Kempsville district
- In office August 12, 2021 – September 29, 2023
- Preceded by: Jessica Abbott
- Succeeded by: David Hutcheson

Member of the Virginia House of Delegates from the 85th district
- In office January 11, 2017 – January 10, 2018
- Preceded by: Scott Taylor
- Succeeded by: Cheryl Turpin

Personal details
- Born: Norman Dewey Holcomb III; 1968 (age 57–58) Bluefield, West Virginia, U.S.
- Party: Republican
- Spouse: Tracie Summerlin
- Children: 2
- Education: Regent University (BS)

Norman Dewey "Rocky" Holcomb III (born 1968) is an American politician who serves as the interim Sheriff of Virginia Beach since September 29, 2023. He served as a member of the Virginia House of Delegates for the 85th district from 2017 to 2018. He is a member of the Republican Party.

== Career ==
Holcomb served in the United States Marine Corps and for the Virginia Beach Sheriff's Office. He won a special election to the Virginia House of Delegates held on January 10, 2017, to succeed Scott Taylor, who had been elected to the United States House of Representatives. He went on to lose the November general election in 2017 to Cheryl Turpin, whom he had faced earlier that year in the special election.

During the 2019 election cycle, instead of running for re-election, Cheryl Turpin decided to instead run for Virginia State Senate. The 85th district seat now vulnerable, Holcomb announced he would run for the seat once more. He was challenged by Democrat Alex Askew, who served as a staffer for Barack Obama‘s 2012 presidential campaign. Holcomb lost to Askew by a margin of 3.46%

On August 12, 2021, Holcomb was appointed to the Virginia Beach City Council after the seat was vacated by Jessica Abbott.
