= Alex Askew =

American politician from Virginia

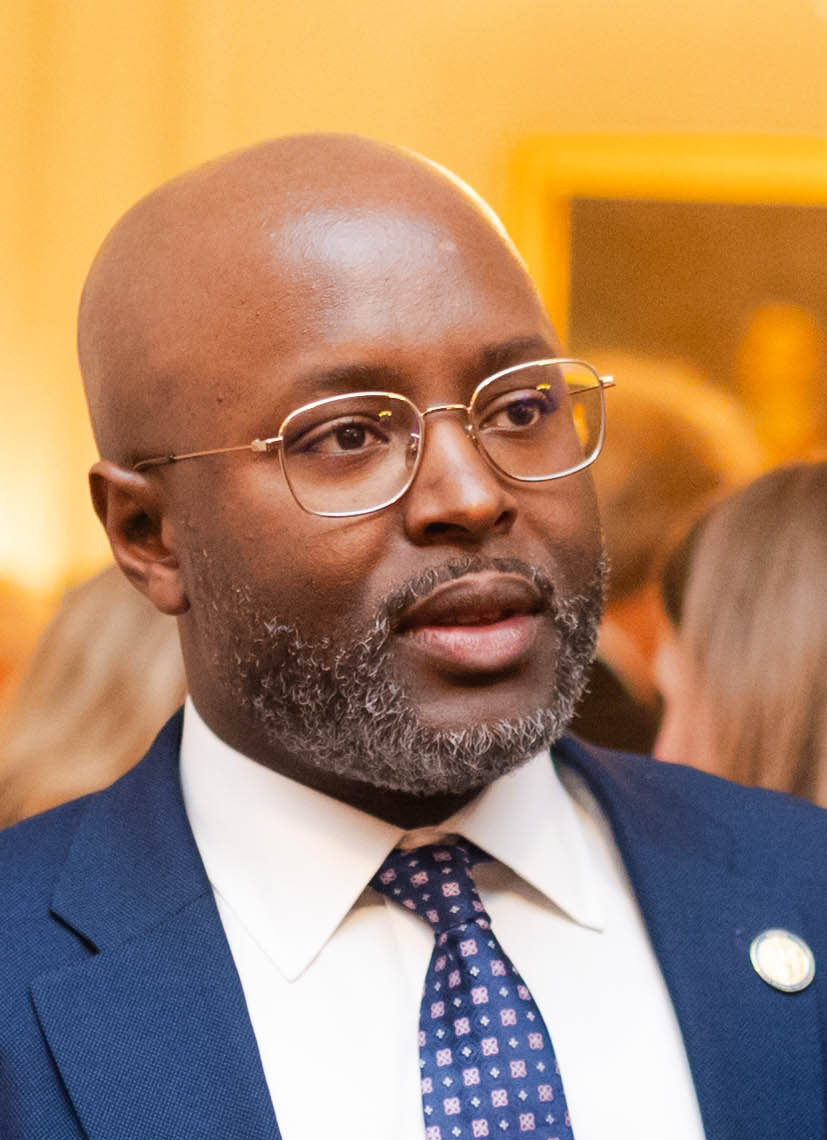
- Askew in 2024

Member of the Virginia House of Delegates
- Incumbent
- Assumed office January 10, 2024
- Preceded by: Marcia Price (redistricting)
- Constituency: 95th district
- In office January 8, 2020 – January 12, 2022
- Preceded by: Cheryl Turpin
- Succeeded by: Karen Greenhalgh
- Constituency: 85th district

Personal details
- Born: 1985 (age 40–41) Virginia Beach, Virginia
- Party: Democratic
- Website: https://alexaskew.com/

Alex Q. Askew (born 1985) is an American politician serving as a Democratic member of the Virginia House of Delegates since January 2024, as well as previously from 2020 to 2022. He serves the 95th district. District 95 represents part of the cities of Norfolk and Virginia Beach.

== Biography ==
Askew was born and raised in Virginia Beach, Virginia. He attended Tallwood High School and graduated from Hampton University. During his career, he worked for a number of political campaigns at all levels, including the presidential campaigns of Barack Obama in 2012 and Bernie Sanders in 2016.

== Political career ==
Askew ran for the 90th district in the 2014 special election, but lost in the Democratic primary to Joe Lindsey.

=== 2019 ===
Askew ran for the 85th district in 2019 to succeed delegate Cheryl Turpin, who was resigning to run for the 7th district of the Virginia Senate. He won the general election against Republican Rocky Holcomb with 51.6% of the vote.

=== 2021 ===
In an upset, Askew was narrowly defeated by cabinet store owner Karen Greenhalgh in the 2021 election. Due to the narrow margin of victory, a recount was conducted in early December. The recount reaffirmed Greenhalgh's victory with 115 votes. Askew conceded shortly thereafter.

=== 2023 ===
Askew ran for the 95th district in the 2023 election. He was unopposed in the general election and assumed office on January 10, 2024.

Virginia House of Delegates
| Preceded by Cheryl Turpin | Member of the Virginia House of Delegates from the 85th district 2020–2022 | Succeeded by Karen Greenhalgh |
| Preceded by Cia Price | Member of the Virginia House of Delegates from the 95th district 2024–Present | Incumbent |
