= George W. Grayson =

American politician

Member of the Virginia House of Delegates
- In office January 11, 1984 – January 9, 2002
- Preceded by: Edwin H. Ragsdale
- Succeeded by: Ryan McDougle
- Constituency: 97th district
- In office January 9, 1974 – January 12, 1983
- Preceded by: Russell M. Carneal
- Succeeded by: Edwin H. Ragsdale
- Constituency: 51st district (1974‍–‍1982); 46th district (1982‍–‍1983)

Personal details
- Born: George Wallace Grayson, Jr. July 23, 1938 Fauquier County, Virginia, U.S.
- Died: March 4, 2015 (aged 76) Williamsburg, Virginia, U.S.
- Party: Democratic
- Education: University of North Carolina at Chapel Hill; Johns Hopkins University; College of William & Mary

George Wallace Grayson Jr. (July 23, 1938 – March 4, 2015) was an American academic and politician from Virginia who represented the Historic Triangle area (Williamsburg, James City County, York County) part-time in the House of Delegates for more than a quarter century, as well as taught government at the College of William & Mary.

== Early and family life ==
Born in Fauquier County during the Great Depression, Grayson obtained a bachelor's degree from the University of North Carolina at Chapel Hill, a master's and doctorate in international studies from Johns Hopkins University and a law degree from the William & Mary Law School in 1976.

== Career ==
Grayson taught courses in government and international affairs at George Washington University in Washington, D.C. and at Mary Washington College in Fredericksburg, Virginia before accepting a position as assistant professor at the College of William & Mary, which also became his legal alma mater. He continued to teach at the college from 1968 until his retirement in 2012, receiving promotions to full professor in 1977, John Marshall Professor of Government in 1982 and becoming the Class of 1938 Professor of Government in 1988. Grayson's professional publications included books and monographs about Mexico, Latin America, and international affairs. He was a senior associate of the Center for Strategic and International Studies, an associate scholar with the Foreign Policy Research institute and a board member of the Center for Immigration Studies, and made more than 200 trips to Mexico and Latin America. Grayson was a member of Phi Beta Kappa, and served as the Alpha Chapter's faculty advisor since 1988.

During most of his time at William & Mary, Grayson represented the Williamsburg and surrounding counties in the Virginia House of Delegates, a part-time position. First running for political office as a Democrat in 1971, Grayson lost to fellow lawyer and legislative veteran Russell M. Carneal, who had represented the area since 1954. Grayson defeated Carneal in the 1973 primary, after which legislators selected Carneal as a judge in York County, where he served until his death in 1998. The district number changed several times during Grayson's tenure, at first because of various legal decisions requiring apportionment under the constitutional "one man-one vote" standard, and later because of census results. Thus he represented District 51 from 1974 to 1982, District 46 from 1982 to 1983, and finally District 97 from 1984 to 2002. He became known for his advocacy of consumer rights and education, and also thwarted a proposed sale of state lands surrounding the college to build a prison.

== Death and legacy ==
Grayson died of an apparent heart attack in 2015, survived by his wife, son, daughter and grandsons.
