= Scott Wyatt (politician) =

Virginia house of representatives member

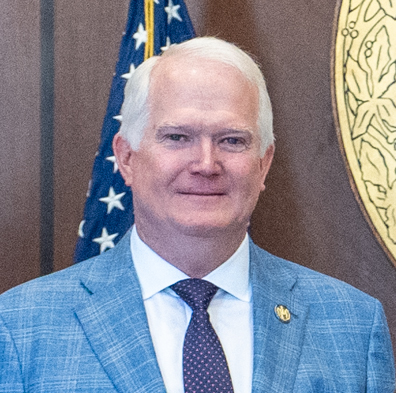
- Wyatt in 2024

Member of the Virginia House of Delegates
- Incumbent
- Assumed office January 8, 2020
- Preceded by: Chris Peace
- Constituency: 97th district (2020–2024); 60th district (2024–present)

Personal details
- Born: 1969 (age 56–57) Richmond, Virginia
- Party: Republican

Scott Wyatt (born 1969) is an American politician. A Republican, he is a member of the Virginia House of Delegates, representing the 60th district.

== Biography ==
Wyatt was born in Richmond, Virginia and served on the Hanover County Board of Supervisors for 4 years, representing the Cold Harbor district.

Wyatt is a member of the neo-Confederate organization known as the Sons of Confederate Veterans.

== Political career ==
=== 2019 ===
After incumbent Chris Peace voted to expand Medicaid, local Republican party representatives chose to nominate Wyatt instead after a divisive convention.

In the general election, Wyatt defeated Democrat Kevin Washington with 55.7% of the vote. 17.7% of the votes were write-ins, most likely for Chris Peace.
