= Flora D. Crittenden =

American politician (1924–2021)

Member of the Virginia House of Delegates from the 95th district
- In office January 13, 1993 – January 14, 2004
- Preceded by: W. Henry Maxwell
- Succeeded by: Mamye BaCote

Personal details
- Born: Flora Lonette Davis; August 10, 1924 Brooklyn, New York, U.S.
- Died: November 2, 2021 (aged 97)
- Party: Democratic
- Spouse: Raymond Crittenden Jr. (m. 1944; died 2010)
- Children: 3
- Education: Virginia State College; Indiana University Bloomington

Flora Lonette Davis Crittenden (August 10, 1924 – November 2, 2021) was an American educator and civil rights activist in Virginia turned politician. She worked as a teacher and guidance counselor in Newport News, Virginia public schools for 32 years, then in 1986 was elected to the Newport News City Council where she served for four years. In 1993 she was elected a member of the Virginia House of Delegates from Newport News, Virginia, and served for eleven years. In 2000, she became chair of the board of Christopher Newport University. A science and math magnet middle school in Newport News is named for her.

== Early life ==
Flora Lonette Davis was born in Brooklyn, New York on August 10, 1924. She moved to Scarsdale, New York, where her parents worked as caretakers at a mansion, then back to Brooklyn after she experienced racial discrimination as an eight-year-old girl.

She spent summers with relatives in Virginia's Hampton Roads area, and after she graduated from elementary school in Brooklyn, came to Newport News, Virginia, to live with her grandmother and aunts. During this time, this section of the city consisted of well-established and clearly defined black and white communities.

Davis attended and in 1941 graduated from the former Huntington High School in East End, Newport News (the only all-black high school in the area until George Washington Carver High School was built in 1949). She then attended Virginia State College, and received a bachelor's degree in physical education in 1945 (although she had wanted to study mathematics at Spellman College in Atlanta). She pledged with the Alpha Kappa Alpha sorority, but her class and work schedule were too heavy to permit full involvement, although Davis later joined the graduate chapter.

== Career in education ==
Upon receiving her bachelor's degree, Crittenden then taught physical education, English and social studies at the new Carver High School in Warwick (which would later be incorporated into Newport News) for seven years. She found its principal Homer L. Hines supported his teachers as well as the community.

In 1956, she and her husband moved their young family to Indiana where they experienced racial segregation while she earned a Master of Science degree in physical education, health sciences and counseling from Indiana University Bloomington. Both Crittendens received their graduate degrees from that university in 1959.

In 1971, Flora Crittenden studied Advanced Guidance Theory at the University of Louisville in Kentucky, which helped her to establish a career counseling program at Carver High School.

Crittenden worked in the Newport News public schools for 32 years—as a teacher and department head for 15 years, and as a guidance counselor and guidance director for another 17 years. Newport News schools did not fully integrate until 1971. She was also long active in the NAACP (including as the chapter president in 1981) as well as Trinity Baptist Church.

== Political career ==
Her political career began in 1986, when Flora Crittenden won election to a four-year term on the Newport News City Council, and she served there until 1990. Prior to the election, Flora was Campaign Manager for Bobby Scott working with a formidable volunteer staff each day. This staff included Richard Jones (assistant Campaign Manager), Lillie Estes, and Shelby Watson to name a few. When delegate Bobby Scott ran for (and won election to) the Virginia Senate from Newport News, his position was taken by Reverend W. Henry Maxwell. When Scott ran for the U.S. Congress, Maxwell ran for (and was elected to) the Virginia Senate seat. Thus, the Virginia delegate position representing Newport News became open, and Crittenden ran and won election as a delegate in the Virginia General Assembly in January 1993. She won re-election in 1995, ran unopposed in 1997 and 1999, and again won easily in 2001. She declined to seek reelection in 2003 and was succeeded by fellow Democrat Mamye BaCote.

== Personal life ==
For 65 years she was married to Raymond Celester ("Coach") Crittenden Jr. (1926–2010), born in Richmond and also an athlete at and graduate of Virginia State University. For fifty years Coach Crittenden also worked as teacher, athletic coach and administrator in the Newport News public schools. Coach died in 2010 after a long illness. They had three surviving children, Raymond III, Thursa, and Alonzo, "Lonnie" who played briefly in the WFL (Wiffle) football league, a short-lived league that folded midway through its second season. His son, her grandson, Alonzo ll died after a tragic, short illness in 2016.

== Later life, honors and death ==
From 2000, Crittenden until retiring for health reasons, Crittenden served as chairperson of the board of Christopher Newport University, the first black woman to hold that post. The former George Washington Carver High School in Newport News was renamed the Flora D. Crittenden Middle School in 1995, and now serves as a magnet school for science and mathematics, although some alumni had opposed the name change desiring to preserve the African-American inventor's name. A new high school was built and honors former Carver High principal Homer L. Hines. The Daily Press, a small town local newspaper named her one of the top ten most influential black women for that part of the Peninsula.

In her final years, Crittenden suffered from Alzheimer's disease and resided in a senior retirement community in Suffolk, Virginia. Crittenden died on November 2, 2021, at the age of 97.

Virginia House of Delegates
| Preceded by W. Henry Maxwell | Virginia Delegate for District 95; 1993–2004 | Succeeded by Mamye BaCote |
