= Russell M. Carneal =

American politician and judge

Member of the Virginia House of Delegates from the Williamsburg–York County–James City County district
- In office 1954–1973
- Succeeded by: Frank E. Mann (District 21); George W. Grayson (District 51)

Personal details
- Born: Russell Morris Carneal; May 9, 1918 Fredericksburg, Virginia, U.S.
- Died: July 27, 1998 (aged 80) Williamsburg, Virginia, U.S.
- Spouse: Elizabeth Leachman
- Children: Robert

Russell Morris Carneal (May 9, 1918 – July 27, 1998) was an American legislator and judge who served in the Virginia House of Delegates from 1954 to 1973. After his retirement from the lower house of the state legislature, Carneal assumed the district court judgeship of York County. In 1977, he was appointed to the Ninth Circuit of the Virginia Circuit Court and retired in 1989. Carneal attended the University of Virginia and served in the United States Navy during World War II. He died in 1998.
