= Virginia's 95th House of Delegates district =

Virginia legislative district

- District map following the 2021 redistricting
- Delegate: Alex Askew
- Population: 84,631
- Registered voters: 56,732

Virginia's 95th House of Delegates district elects one of the 100 members of the Virginia House of Delegates, which is the lower house of the state's bicameral legislature. The seat is currently held by Alex Askew.

Following the 2021 Virginia redistricting, the district was formed from parts of the 83rd, 85th, and 90th Virginia House of Delegates districts. District 95 represents part of the cities of Norfolk and Virginia Beach.

== List of delegates ==
Delegate	Party	Years	Electoral history
W. Henry Maxwell	Democratic	January 12, 1983 – January 13, 1993	Elected to Senate
Flora D. Crittenden	Democratic	January 13, 1993 – January 14, 2004	Did not seek reelection
Mamye BaCote	Democratic	January 14, 2004 – January 13, 2016	Did not seek reelection
Marcia Price	Democratic	January 13, 2016 – present	First elected in 2015. Redistricted to the 85th district
Alex Askew	Democratic	January 10, 2024 – present	Following redistricting
