= Michael Feggans =

American politician from Virginia

Mike Feggans
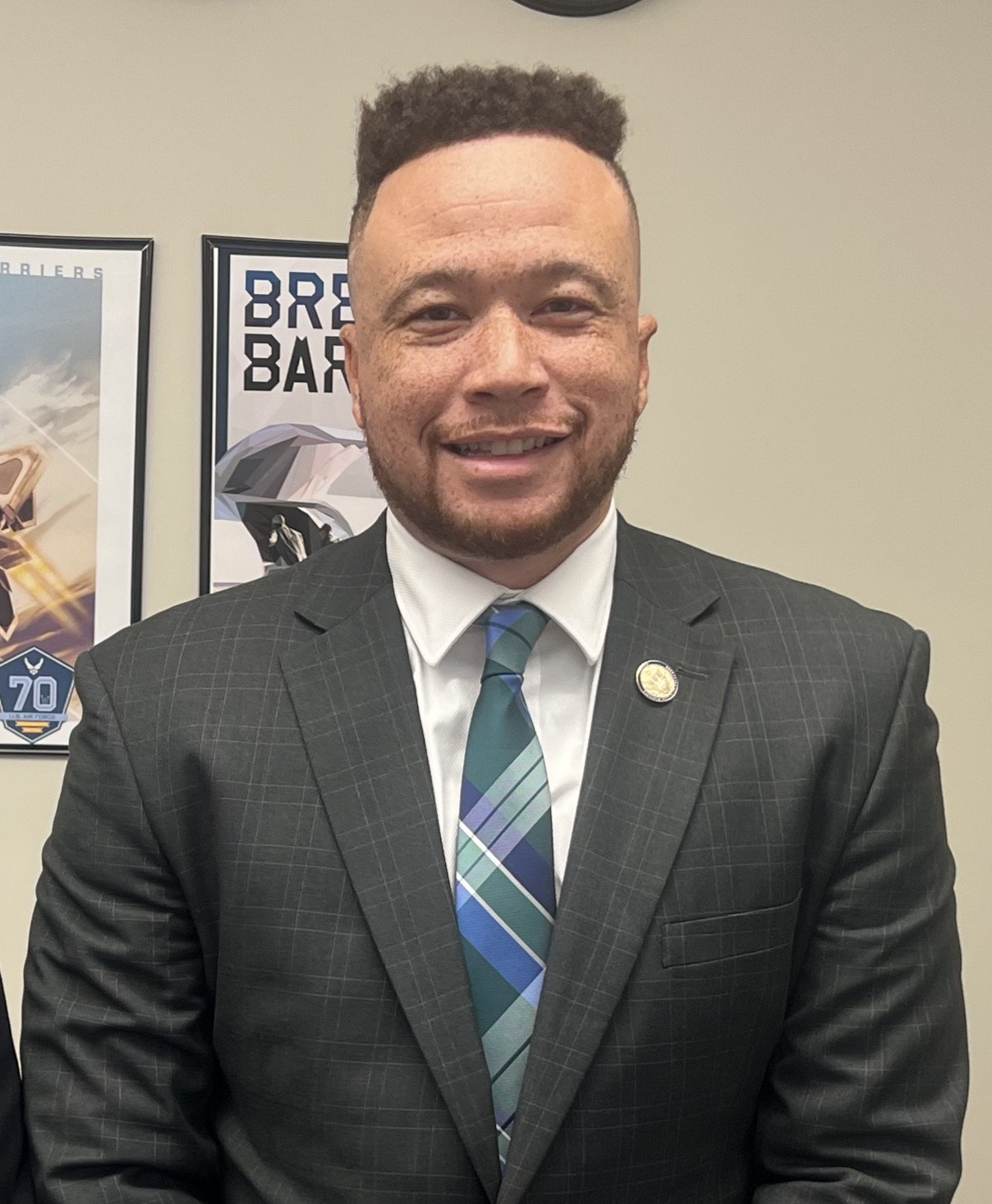
- Feggans in 2025

Member of the Virginia House of Delegates from the 97th district
- Incumbent
- Assumed office January 10, 2024
- Preceded by: Karen Greenhalgh

Personal details
- Born: July 10, 1983 (age 43) Alexandria, Louisiana, U.S.
- Party: Democratic
- Education: Air University (AA); Park University (BS); Norfolk State University (MS)

Military service
- Allegiance: United States
- Branch/service: United States Air Force
- Rank: Master Sergeant
- Battles/wars: Operation Enduring Freedom

Michael B. Feggans (born July 10, 1983) is an American veteran, cybersecurity specialist, and politician serving as a Democratic member of the Virginia House of Delegates from the 97th district.

Feggans was re-elected in the 2025 Virginia House of Delegates election.

== Early life and education ==
Feggans was born in Alexandria, Louisiana, and raised in Virginia Beach, his mother worked for over 30 years as a Norfolk Public Schools teacher and his father worked for more than 20 years as a firefighter at Norfolk International Airport.

Feggans graduated from Tallwood High School and enlisted in the U.S. Air Force in August 2001. He then earned an Associate of Arts degree in healthcare administration from the Community College of the Air Force at Air University, a Bachelors of Science in healthcare administration from Park University in 2010, and a Master of Science in cybersecurity from Norfolk State University in 2019.

== Career ==
While in active duty, Feggans served as an intern in the Norfolk office of U.S. Senator Mark Warner. He also worked as a cybersecurity intern in the office of Virginia Secretary of Technology Karen Jackson. He founded Outerbridge Technical Solutions and has served as its CEO since 2017.

=== U.S. Air Force ===
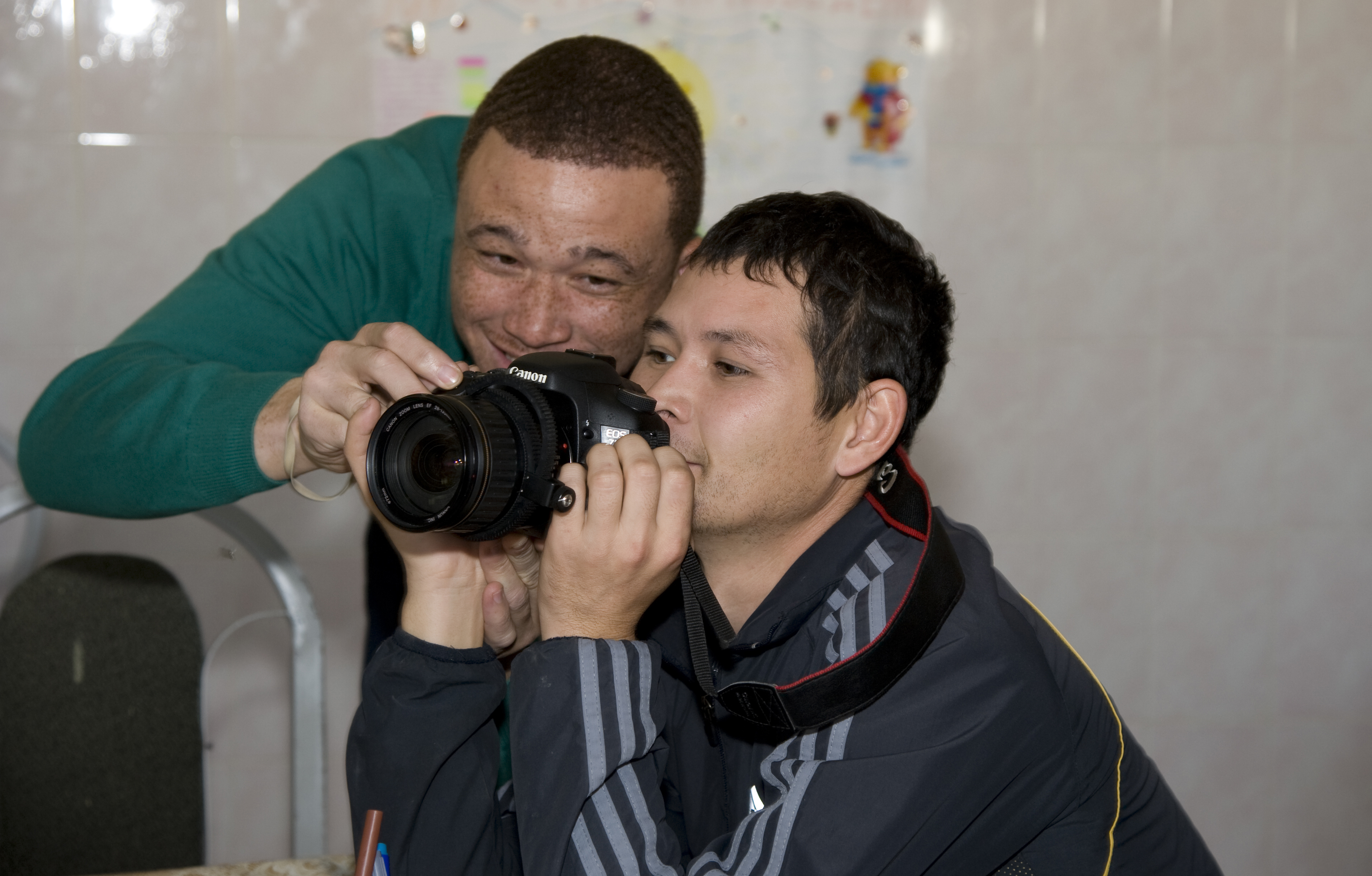
Then-Tech. Sgt. Michael Feggans (left) teaches a disabled student how to use a camera in Kyrgyzstan (2013).

Feggans enlisted in the U.S. Air Force in August 2001 immediately after high school. Feggans was then deployed to Kyrgyzstan to support Afghanistan missions for Operation Enduring Freedom. There, Feggans led the aeromedical evacuations operations for injured service members returning from Afghanistan and served as the medical IT mission planner.

Later, Feggans oversaw a hospital development program in Gimhae, South Korea, and finally was deployed to Andersen Air Force Base in Guam to establish a Team Rubicon disaster response support branch in the region. In 2020, Feggans noted that racism against African Americans persisted in the Air Force, citing the challenges of navigating racial bias as a serviceman and a leader. After 20 years in service, he retired with the rank of Master Sergeant.

== Virginia House of Delegates ==
Feggans ran for the Virginia House of Delegates in the 97th district in 2023 as part of an historically diverse class of Democratic candidates. He defeated Republican incumbent Karen Greenhalgh in the general election with 52% of the vote. He took office on January 10, 2024.

=== Committees and caucuses ===
Feggans serves on the following committees and associated subcommittees:

- Public Safety
  - Public Safety – Firearms
- Transportation
  - Transportation – Department of Motor Vehicles
  - Transportation – Innovations (Ad Hoc)
- Labor and Commerce
  - Labor and Commerce – Subcommittee #2

Additionally, he is a member of the Virginia Legislative Black Caucus.

=== Electoral history ===
Virginia's 97th House of Delegates District, 2023 general election
Party	Candidate	Votes	%
Democratic	Michael Feggans	12,734	52.37
Republican	Karen Greenhalgh (incumbent)	11,555	47.52
Write-in		28	0.12
Total votes		24,317	100
Democratic gain from Republican			

Virginia's 97th House of Delegates District, 2025 general election
Party	Candidate	Votes	%
Democratic	Michael Feggans	17,496	57.41%
Republican	Tim Anderson	12,926	42.41%
