= Frank Wagner (American politician) =

American politician (born 1955)

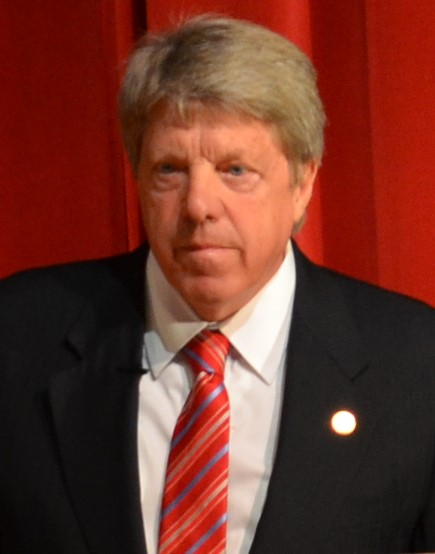

Member of the Virginia Senate from the 7th district
- In office January 9, 2001 – May 8, 2019
- Preceded by: Ed Schrock
- Succeeded by: Jen Kiggans

Member of the Virginia House of Delegates from the 21st district
- In office January 8, 1992 – January 9, 2001
- Preceded by: Charles R. Hawkins
- Succeeded by: John Welch

Personal details
- Born: July 18, 1955 (age 71) Ruislip, England, UK
- Party: Republican
- Education: United States Naval Academy (BS)

Military service
- Allegiance: United States
- Branch/service: United States Navy
- Years of service: 1973–1982

Frank W. Wagner (born July 18, 1955) is an American politician. A Republican, he served in the Virginia House of Delegates 1992–2001, and was elected to the Senate of Virginia in a special election on December 19, 2000. He represented the 7th district in Virginia Beach and Norfolk from 2001 until 2019. He was a member of the Commerce and Labor, General Laws and Technology, Rehabilitation and Social Services, and Transportation committees.

== Personal life ==
Wagner was born at a United States Air Force base in England. He graduated from the United States Naval Academy in 1977, with a B.S. degree in Ocean Engineering. He served in the United States Navy as a diving and salvage officer and an engineering duty officer, then went into the boat building and repair business. He was the president and CEO of Davis Boatworks until he sold the company in 2015.

== Political career ==
In August 2016, Wagner announced his candidacy for the Republican nomination for governor in 2017. He ran on the slogan "One veteran, one businessman, one Virginian, one choice."

He lost the primary election on June 13, 2017, placing in third behind Corey Stewart and Ed Gillespie, the latter of whom became the Republican nominee.

In March 2019, Wagner announced he would not seek re-election in the 2019 Virginia Senate election. Two months after announcing his retirement, Wagner resigned his Senate seat to accept Governor Ralph Northam's appointment to become Deputy Director of the Virginia Lottery. He was succeeded in the Senate by Republican Jen Kiggans.
