= Ryan McDougle =

American politician from Virginia

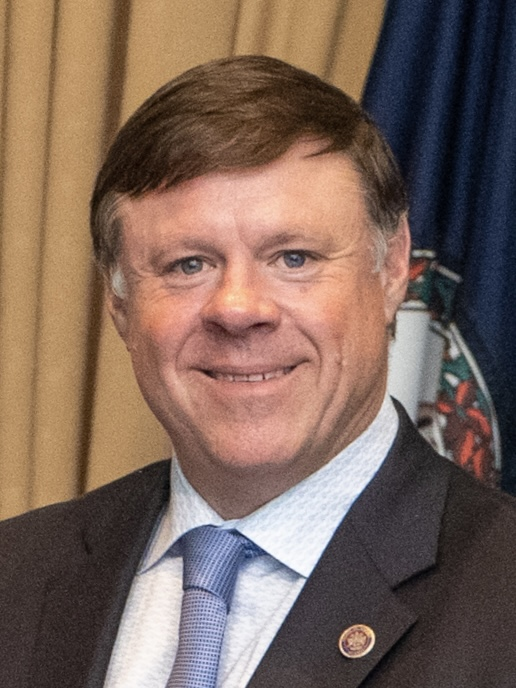

Minority Leader of the Virginia Senate
- Incumbent
- Assumed office January 10, 2024
- Preceded by: Tommy Norment

Member of the Virginia Senate
- Incumbent
- Assumed office January 11, 2006
- Preceded by: Bill Bolling
- Constituency: 4th district (2006–2024); 26th district (since 2024)

Member of the Virginia House of Delegates from the 97th district
- In office January 9, 2002 – January 11, 2006
- Preceded by: George Grayson
- Succeeded by: Chris Peace

Personal details
- Born: Ryan Todd McDougle; November 9, 1971 (age 55) Hanover, Virginia, U.S.
- Party: Republican
- Education: James Madison University (BA); College of William and Mary (JD)
- Website: Campaign website

Ryan Todd McDougle (born November 9, 1971) is an American politician. A Republican, he served in the Virginia House of Delegates from 2002 until 2006. He was elected to the Senate of Virginia. Since 2006, he has represented the 4th district, representing six counties and part of a seventh.

== Early life ==
McDougle was born in Hanover, Virginia, on November 9, 1971.

== Career ==
McDougle was listed as an appellee in Scott v. McDougle, in which the Supreme Court of Virginia nullified the 2026 redistricting amendment, as he was an opponent of the measure. Attorney General Jay Jones, filed an emergency appeal to the US Supreme Court to pause the state supreme court's ruling, which was not heard.

McDougle was a leading critic of the 2011 redistricting of the Virginia Senate.

=== Political positions ===
==== Gun control ====
Following the Virginia Tech shooting, McDougle, along with delegate Bill Janis, proposed several gun control bills in the state Senate. McDougle successfully sponsored Senate Bill 226, which enforced a new law which required firearm purchasers to be asked whether they ever have been involuntarily committed to mental health treatment.

==== Cannabis ====
McDougle supports the use of cannabis. However, he opposes use of cannabis in an apartment complex. Senate bill 1406, is an ongoing bill which will legalize cannabis in Virginia, under certain circumstances. McDougle opposed this bill.

== Electoral history ==
=== 2007 ===
Unopposed

=== 2011 ===
Unopposed

=== 2015 ===
Unopposed

=== 2019 ===
2019 Virginia state senate elections
Party	Candidate	Votes	%
Republican	Ryan McDougle	45,714	63%
Democratic	Stan Scott	26,654	36.7%
Other	Other/Write-in votes	173	0.2%
Total votes		72,541	100.0%

=== 2023 ===
2023 Virginia state senate elections
Party	Candidate	Votes	%
Republican	Ryan McDougle	57,026	62.13%
Democratic	Pam Garner	34,684	37.79%
Other	Other/Write-in votes	74	0.08%
Total votes		91,784	100.0%

Virginia House of Delegates
Preceded by George Grayson	Member of the Virginia House of Delegates from the 97th district 2002–2006	Succeeded by Chris Peace
Senate of Virginia
Preceded by Bill Bolling	Member of the Virginia Senate from the 4th district 2006–2024	Succeeded by Dave Suetterlein
Preceded by Mark Obenshain	Member of the Virginia Senate from the 26th district 2024–present	Incumbent
Preceded by Tommy Norment	Minority Leader of the Virginia Senate; 2024–present	Incumbent
