= Marcia Price =

American politician from Virginia

Cia Price
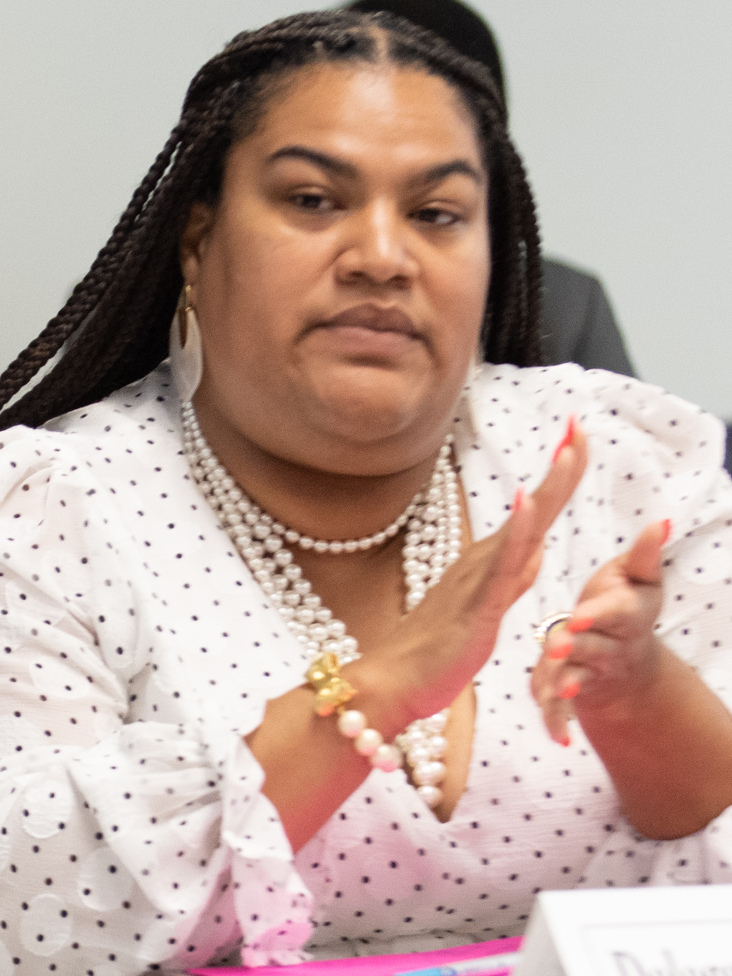

Member of the Virginia House of Delegates
- Incumbent
- Assumed office January 13, 2016
- Preceded by: Mamye BaCote
- Constituency: 95th District (2016–2024); 85th District (2024–Present)

Personal details
- Born: Marcia Simone Price; July 20, 1980 (age 46) Hampton, Virginia, U.S.
- Party: Democratic
- Education: Spelman College; Howard University
- Profession: McKinley L. Price (father); Bobby Scott (uncle)
- Committees: Health, Welfare and Institutions; Privileges and Elections
- Website: www.pricefordelegate.com

Marcia Simone "Cia" Price (born July 20, 1980) is an American politician serving as a member of the Virginia House of Delegates for the 85th district, which includes parts of the cities of Hampton and Newport News.

== Virginia House of Delegates ==
Price sponsored the Voting Rights Act of Virginia.

Price is the chair of the House Privileges and Elections Committee.

== Personal life ==
Price is the daughter of former mayor of Newport News McKinley L. Price and the niece of U.S. representative Bobby Scott.

She identifies as pansexual.

== Electoral history ==
Date	Election	Candidate	Party	Votes	%
Virginia House of Delegates, 95th district
Nov 3, 2015	General	Marcia S. "Cia" Price	Democratic	6,106	75.76
Nov 3, 2015	General	Pricillia E. Burnett	Independent Green	1,845	22.89
Nov 3, 2015	General	Write Ins		109	1.35
Nov 3, 2015	General	Mamye BaCote retired; seat stayed Democratic			

Date	Election	Candidate	Party	Votes	%
Virginia House of Delegates, 85th district
Nov 7, 2023	General	Marcia S. "Cia" Price	Democratic	12,335	89.56
Nov 7, 2023	General	Write Ins		1,438	10.44

Virginia House of Delegates
Preceded by Mamye BaCote	Member of the Virginia House of Delegates from the 95th district 2016–2024	Succeeded by Alex Askew
Preceded by Karen Greenhalgh	Member of the Virginia House of Delegates from the 85th district 2024–Present	Incumbent
