= Scott Taylor (politician) =

American politician (born 1979)

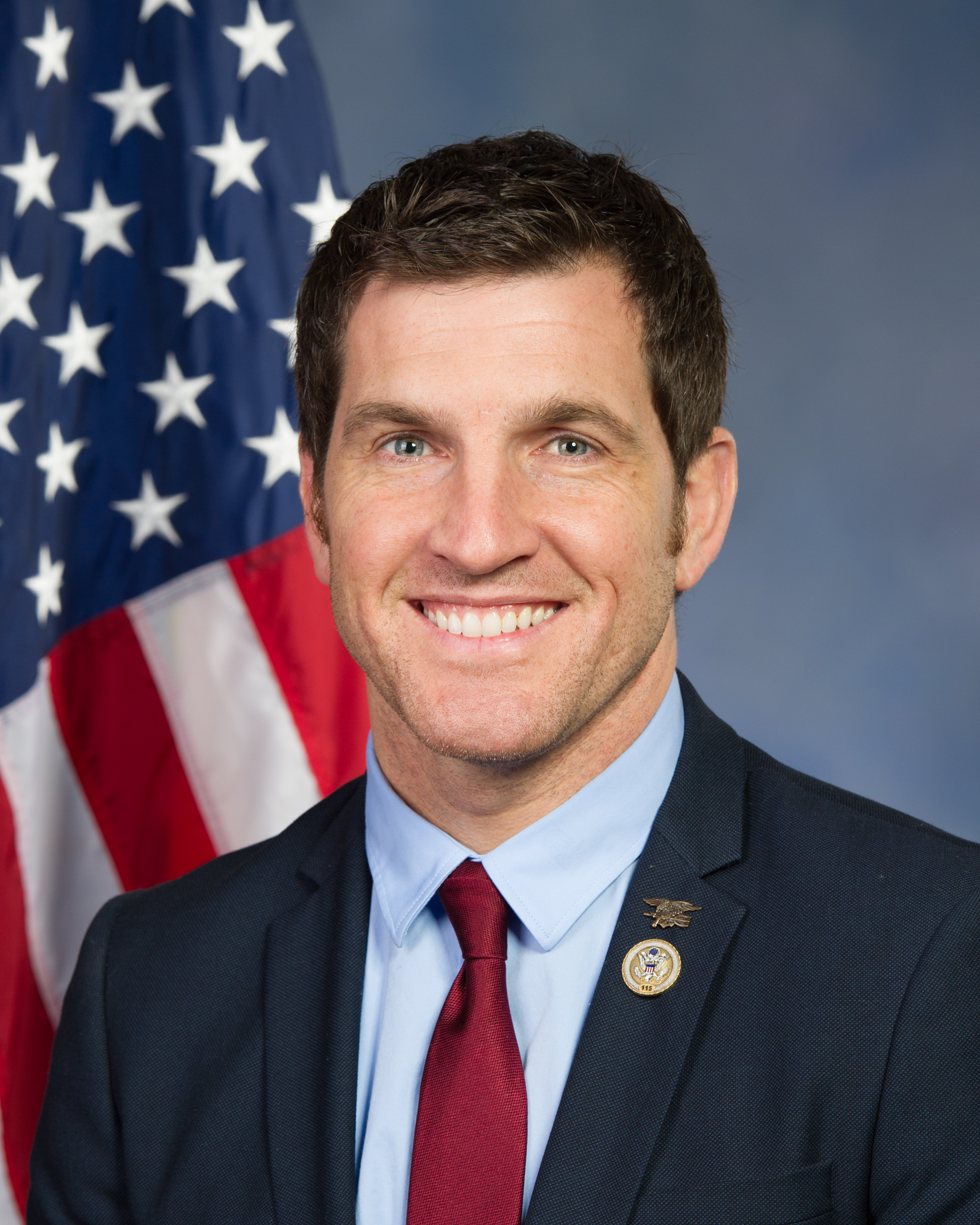
- Official portrait, 2017

Member of the U.S. House of Representatives from Virginia's 2nd district
- In office January 3, 2017 – January 3, 2019
- Preceded by: Scott Rigell
- Succeeded by: Elaine Luria

Member of the Virginia House of Delegates from the 85th district
- In office January 8, 2014 – January 3, 2017
- Preceded by: Bob Tata
- Succeeded by: Rocky Holcomb

Personal details
- Born: Scott William Taylor; June 27, 1979 (age 47) Baltimore, Maryland, U.S.
- Party: Republican
- Spouse: Heather Taylor
- Children: 2
- Education: Old Dominion University (attended); Harvard University Extension School (BLA, MLA)

Military service
- Branch/service: United States Navy
- Years of service: 1997–2005
- Unit: Navy SEALs
- Battles/wars: Iraq War

Scott William Taylor (born June 27, 1979) is an American politician and former Navy SEAL who served as the U.S. representative for Virginia's 2nd congressional district from 2017 to 2019. A member of the Republican Party, he previously served as a member of the Virginia House of Delegates for the 85th district. On November 6, 2018, Taylor was defeated for reelection by Democratic nominee Elaine Luria. On July 8, 2019, he announced his intention to run for the United States Senate in 2020. However, in December 2019, he instead opted to run again for his old seat in the U.S. House of Representatives. In the November general election, he was defeated by Luria in a rematch.

== Early life and education ==
Scott William Taylor was born in Baltimore and raised in Hebron, Maryland.

After high school, he enlisted in the United States Navy. Taylor received orders to Basic Underwater Demolition/SEAL training (BUD/S) at Naval Amphibious Base Coronado. Taylor graduated with BUD/S class 219 in October 1998 and then attended Basic Airborne School at Fort Benning, Georgia. Following SEAL Tactical Training (STT) and completion of six month probationary period, he received the Navy Enlisted Classification (NEC) 5326 as a Combatant Swimmer (SEAL), entitled to wear the Special Warfare insignia. He deployed in counternarcotics and foreign intelligence defense missions with SEAL Team 4. He is fluent in Spanish and served overseas in South and Central America in counternarcotics and foreign internal defense missions.

A combat veteran of Operation Iraqi Freedom, Taylor was a SEAL sniper, and was injured on a combat mission in Ramadi, Iraq. He spent two years as a SEAL instructor teaching marksmanship and reconnaissance. Taylor appeared in the Discovery Channel feature Secrets of Seal Team 6.

After leaving the military, Taylor worked in security consulting and critical infrastructure protection, frequently traveling to Yemen. He received a certification in government contracting from Old Dominion University, a Bachelor of Liberal Arts and a Masters of Liberal Arts from the Harvard Extension School.

== Early career ==
In 2008, Taylor ran for Mayor of Virginia Beach, Virginia. He was a candidate in the 2010 primary election for Virginia's 2nd congressional district, but lost to automobile dealer Scott Rigell. Taylor was elected to the Virginia House of Delegates for the 85th district in November 2013, where, as a delegate, Taylor cosponsored a bill to outlaw discrimination based on sexual orientation and gender identity in labor and housing.

In 2012, Taylor founded and served as chairman for the Special Operations OPSEC Education Fund, a 501(c) Political Action Committee formed in 2012 accusing the Obama Administration of security leaks and taking too much credit for the killing of Osama bin Laden in 2011.

Taylor passed an equity crowdfunding bill into a law which makes it easier for small businesses to access capital. He also established The Veterans Services Foundation Act which states that, to support its mission, the foundation can accept funds from all sources including private fundraising and others. He also passed a bill to establish a veterans resource center with at least one full-time veterans advisor on the campus of each of the seven comprehensive community colleges in the Commonwealth.

== U.S. House of Representatives ==
=== Elections ===
==== 2016 ====
In 2016, after the incumbent Scott Rigell, a Republican, announced he would not seek re-election, Taylor won the Republican Party nomination for Virginia's 2nd congressional district in the United States House of Representatives, defeating Randy Forbes in the primary, then defeated Democrat Shaun Brown, 61.3% to 38.5%, to win the general election on November 8, 2016. Taylor was a member of the Republican Main Street Partnership, as well as of the Republican Study Committee and the Climate Solutions Caucus.

==== 2018 ====
In January 2018, former Navy commander Elaine Luria announced her intention to run for Taylor's seat. In the June 10 Democratic primary, Luria received 62% of the vote, defeating Karen Mallard, who received 38%. In the Republican primary, Taylor defeated Mary Jones, 76% to 24%.

In August 2018, a special prosecutor was appointed to investigate reports that members of Taylor's campaign staff had added fake names to ballot access petitions intended to help independent candidate Shaun Brown get on the ballot. Gathering signatures to put another candidate on the ballot is legal, and observers believed that Brown's "appearance on the ballot threatens to split the Democratic vote in a highly competitive race." A Freedom of Information Act request made by WHRO-TV found that four paid workers on Taylor's campaign had collected signatures to put Shaun Brown on the ballot as an independent candidate in the 2nd district race. In August, following allegations that some of the signatures gathered by his staff were forged, Taylor said "My campaign has a zero-tolerance policy for inappropriate activities" and he severed ties with his campaign consultant.

In May 2019, one of the four former staffers was indicted on two counts of election fraud, a felony punishable by one to 10 years in prison and a $2,500 fine. The special prosecutor found no evidence of wrongdoing on Taylor's part, but said that "what actually happened within the campaign headquarters is still a subject of investigation due primarily to the lack of cooperation of key individuals." In March 2021, Heather Guillot, a former campaign staffer for Taylor's 2018 re-election campaign, pleaded guilty to a misdemeanor election fraud count. She had been charged with a felony, but accepted a plea deal offered by the special prosecutor to plead guilty to the misdemeanor. In June 2021, Taylor's former campaign consultant Rob Catron became the fourth person to be indicted for election fraud in connection with Taylor's campaign for Congress.

On November 6, 2018, Taylor lost to Luria, taking 48.9% of the vote to Luria's 51.1%.

==== 2020 ====
On July 8, 2019, Taylor announced that he was running for the United States Senate against two-term incumbent Mark Warner in the 2020 election. In an interview with the Associated Press after announcing his candidacy, Taylor said that his military service and moderate social views could help attract voters. He accused Warner of moving away from centrist pro-business policies that he embraced as governor and focusing too heavily on fostering the "illusion" that Donald Trump colluded with Russia.

Taylor decided to withdraw from the Senate race on December 9, 2019, instead opting to take back his old House seat. On June 23, 2020, he won the Republican primary, setting up a rematch with Luria.

Luria defeated him and was re-elected with a six-point margin taking 52% to Taylor's 46%.

=== Tenure ===
Taylor proposed a VA SEA Act from his concerns with senior VA officials' responses to complaints about poor management at the Hampton Veterans Affairs Medical Center. His Act became a law in 2018. The U.S. Congress also passed his Ashanti Alert Act. He later proposed a Defense Roads Appropriations language, stating that the Department of Defense can work with the Department of Transportation to help fund off-base projects in the areas of reoccurring floods and sea level rise.

== Political positions ==
=== Abortion ===
Taylor opposes abortion and opposes taxpayer funding of abortion.

=== Military ===
In April 2018, Taylor praised President Trump for the "measured" and "calculated" military action carried out under his direction in Syria in conjunction with the French and British. Taylor said that he was "torn" in regard to taking international military action, but in the case of Syria he felt that Trump "listened to his advisers".

=== LGBT rights ===
Asked in 2010 about the pending end of Don't Ask Don't Tell, he said, "I encourage everyone to honorably serve in the military regardless of their sexual orientation. Heterosexual relationships are not permitted to take place while our men and women serve their country, so I believe this to be a completely political move."

In March 2017, the first bill Taylor introduced as a congressman was to outlaw discrimination based on sexual orientation or gender identity when renting or selling housing.

Taylor was a cosponsor of H.R. 2282, the version of the Equality Act submitted in the House of Representatives during the 115th Congress.

In September 2017, Taylor said he opposed the ban on transgender persons in the military. "If you are able to serve, serve," he said. "I don't care if you are gay, straight, transgender or not. If you are ready to go, cool." He said that the military should not have to pay for gender-reassignment surgery.

=== Immigration ===
Taylor supported President Donald Trump's 2017 executive order to impose a temporary ban on entry to the U.S. to citizens of seven Muslim-majority countries. He stated that "While I do not agree with some of the rhetoric, taking a pause, figuring out if we are properly vetting people, and making changes if necessary to continue our American principles is prudent and needed. The safety and protection of our citizens must remain our number one priority."

In 2018, Taylor stated that he opposed deporting people who were brought into the United States illegally as children. He also said that he wanted to find ways for others who were in the country illegally to "get right with the law". Taylor favors increasing immigration enforcement and border security but opposes Trump's plan to build a wall along the border with Mexico.

=== Cannabis legalization ===
On February 27, 2017, Taylor was an original cosponsor for bill H.R. 1227 – Ending Federal Marijuana Prohibition Act of 2017.

=== Healthcare ===
On May 4, 2017, Taylor voted Yes on H.R. 1628 (AHCA of 2017).

=== Energy and the environment ===
Taylor accepts that climate change is happening, but argues that there are questions as to humans' contribution to climate change. Taylor said, "there are the questions about what man can do about" climate change.

During Taylor's unsuccessful congressional primary campaign in 2010, he voiced support for offshore oil drilling along Virginia's coast. In 2018, after President Trump announced plans to lift a ban on offshore oil drilling in the Atlantic Ocean, Taylor voiced his opposition, saying that drilling could interfere with military training and citing opposition from localities within his district.

=== Taxation ===
Taylor supported the Tax Cuts and Jobs Act of 2017. He came under criticism for this from his 2018 Democratic challenger, Elaine Luria, who argued that most of the benefits of the bill went to the wealthiest people, and that 98% of families only saw an average tax cut of $688. "I can tell you right now that $688 could be the difference between the lights going on or off," said Taylor, adding he was raised by a single mother on a modest income. "Nine out of ten people in this district have seen more money in their own pockets… I know the benefit of that tax reform here and I'm proud I supported it."

=== Donald Trump ===
In February 2017, following President Trump's likening of the intelligence community to Nazi Germany, Taylor said that Trump and the intelligence community "need to get on the same page very quickly." He criticized Trump's decision to place Steve Bannon on the National Security Council.

Asked about Trump's expenditures of millions of taxpayer dollars on the travel and security of his family, Taylor said that the expenses were "a legitimate concern" but argued that the Obama family spent similar amounts.

As of October 2018, FiveThirtyEight found that Taylor voted with Trump's position 97.8% of the time.

== Book ==
He published a book in February 2015, Trust Betrayed: Barack Obama, Hillary Clinton, and The Selling Out of America's National Security, through the independent publisher Skyhorse Publishing. In his book, he criticized Vice President Joe Biden for revealing that it was SEAL Team Six that killed Osama bin Laden. He blamed the poor diplomatic security that led to the Benghazi fiasco on the Obama administration's desire for a "light footprint" in Libya, which he argues was caused by a foreign-policy doctrine that placed U.S. interests underneath partisan politics.

== Electoral history ==
Virginia's 2nd congressional district election, 2016
Party	Candidate	Votes	%
Republican	Scott Taylor	190,475	61.33%
Democratic	Shaun D. Brown	119,440	38.46%
Write-in		652	0.21%
Total votes		310,567	100.00%
Republican hold			

Virginia's 2nd congressional district election, 2018
Party	Candidate	Votes	%
Democratic	Elaine Luria	139,571	51.05%
Republican	Scott Taylor (Incumbent)	133,458	48.81%
Write-in		371	0.14%
Total votes		273,400	100.00%
Democratic gain from Republican			

== See also ==
- List of United States Navy SEALs

U.S. House of Representatives
Preceded by Scott Rigell	Member of the U.S. House of Representatives from Virginia's 2nd congressional district 2017–2019	Succeeded by Elaine Luria
U.S. order of precedence (ceremonial)
Preceded by Tom Garrett as Former U.S. Representative	Order of precedence of the United States as Former U.S. Representative	Succeeded by Denver Riggleman as Former U.S. Representative
