= Virginia's 7th Senate district =

American legislative district

Virginia's 7th State Senate district
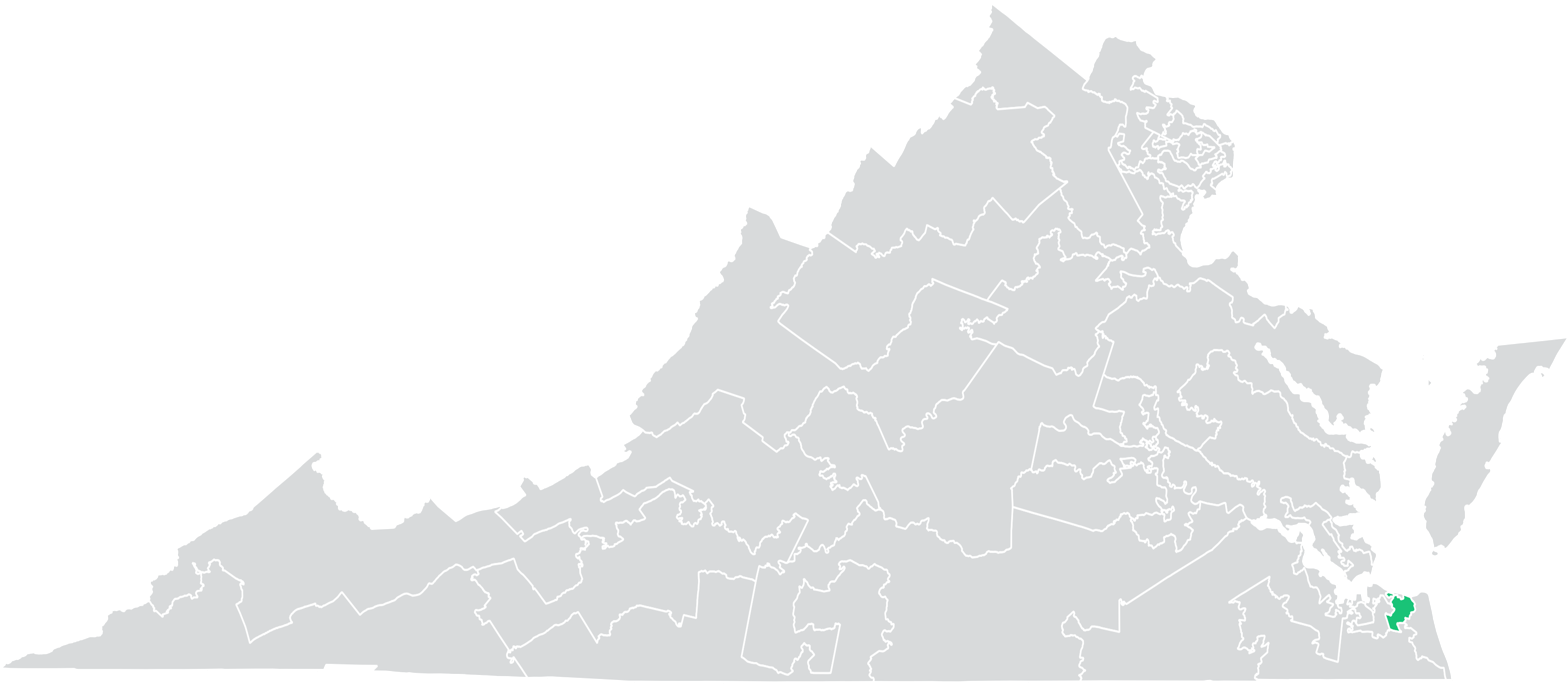
Senator
Bill Stanley; R–Rocky Mount
- Demographics: 59% White; 21% Black; 9% Hispanic; 7% Asian; 4% Other
- Population (2019): 208,440
- Registered voters: 142,498

Virginia's 7th Senate district is one of 40 districts in the Senate of Virginia. The seat is currently held by Republican William M. Stanley Jr., who was elected in 2011. Stanley represented Virginia's 20th Senate district prior to 2024 redistricting.

Virginia's 7th State Senate district before the 2023 election

== Geography ==
District 7 is located in southwestern Virginia, including the counties of Carroll, Floyd, Franklin, Grayson, Henry, Patrick, and a portion of Wythe. The independent cities that are part of District 7 include Galax and Martinsville.

The district is located entirely within Virginia's 9th congressional district, and overlaps with the 39th, 46th, 47th, and 48th districts of the Virginia House of Delegates.

== Recent election results ==
=== 2023 special ===
2023 Virginia Senate special election, District 7
Party	Candidate	Votes	%
Democratic	Aaron Rouse	19,430	50.4
Republican	Kevin Adams	19,082	49.5
Total votes		38,546	100
Democratic gain from Republican			

=== 2019 ===
2019 Virginia Senate election, District 7
Primary election
Party	Candidate	Votes	%
Republican	Jen Kiggans	4,045	51.6
Republican	Carolyn Weems	3,789	48.4
Total votes		7,836	100
Democratic	Cheryl Turpin	3,268	58.7
Democratic	Susan Bates Hippen	1,531	27.5
Democratic	Kim Howard	761	13.7
Total votes		5,566	100
General election
Republican	Jen Kiggans	29,609	50.4
Democratic	Cheryl Turpin	29,098	49.5
Total votes		58,798	100
Republican hold			

=== 2015 ===
2015 Virginia Senate election, District 7
Party	Candidate	Votes	%
Republican	Frank Wagner (incumbent)	18,266	53.9
Democratic	Gary McCollum	15,434	45.5
Total votes		33,908	100
Republican hold			

=== 2011 ===
2011 Virginia Senate election, District 7
Party	Candidate	Votes	%
Republican	Frank Wagner (incumbent)	17,303	96.8
Total votes		17,869	100
Republican hold			

=== Federal and statewide results ===
Year	Office	Results
2020	President	Biden 54.1–44.1%
2017	Governor	Northam 53.5–45.3%
2016	President	Clinton 47.1–46.9%
2014	Senate	Gillespie 49.9–47.4%
2013	Governor	Cuccinelli 47.1–46.4%
2012	President	Obama 49.5–49.1%
2012	Senate	Kaine 51.7–48.3%

== Historical results ==
All election results below took place prior to 2011 redistricting, and thus were under different district lines.

=== 2007 ===
2007 Virginia Senate election, District 7
Party	Candidate	Votes	%
Republican	Frank Wagner (incumbent)	15,426	96.8
Total votes		15,943	100
Republican hold			

=== 2003 ===
2003 Virginia Senate election, District 7
Primary election
Party	Candidate	Votes	%
Republican	Frank Wagner (incumbent)	12,694	59.0
Democratic	Clancy A. Holland	8,737	40.6
Total votes		21,507	100
Republican hold			

=== 2000 special ===
2000 Virginia Senate special election, District 7
Primary election
Party	Candidate	Votes	%
Republican	Frank Wagner	11,041	68.8
Democratic	Louisa Strayhorn	4,998	31.1
Total votes		16,058	100
Republican hold			

=== 1999 ===
1999 Virginia Senate election, District 7
Party	Candidate	Votes	%
Republican	Ed Schrock (incumbent)	24,127	97.7
Total votes		24,694	100
Republican hold			

=== 1995 ===
1995 Virginia Senate election, District 7
Primary election
Party	Candidate	Votes	%
Republican	Ed Schrock	1,963	58.6
Republican	Walter Erb	1,386	41.4
Total votes		3,349	100
General election
Republican	Ed Schrock	16,147	55.8
Democratic	Clancy A. Holland (incumbent)	12,773	44.2
Total votes		28,928	100
Republican gain from Democratic			

== District officeholders since 1940 ==
Years	Senator, District 6	Counties/Cities in District
1940–1942	H. B. Moseley (D)	Brunswick County and Mecklenburg County
1942–1944	Y. Melvin Hodges (D)	Brunswick County and Mecklenburg County
1944–1948	Y. Melvin Hodges (D)	Brunswick County and Mecklenburg County
1948–1952	Albertis S. Harrison, Jr. (D)	Brunswick County and Mecklenburg County
1952–1956	Albertis S. Harrison, Jr. (D)	Brunswick County and Mecklenburg County
1956–1958	Albertis S. Harrison, Jr. (D)	Brunswick County, Lunenburg County, and Mecklenburg County
1958–1960	Joseph C. Hutcheson (D)	Brunswick County, Lunenburg County, and Mecklenburg County
1960–1962	Joseph C. Hutcheson (D)	Brunswick County, Lunenburg County, and Mecklenburg County
1962–1966	Joseph C. Hutcheson (D)	Brunswick County, Lunenburg County, and Mecklenburg County
1966–1972	Joseph C. Hutcheson (D)	Brunswick County, Dinwiddie County, Mecklenburg County, and the City of Petersburg
1972–1976	Stanley C. Walker (D); Peter K. Babalas (D); Thomas McNamara (D)	City of Norfolk, City of Virginia Beach (part)
1976–1980	Stanley C. Walker (D); Peter K. Babalas (D); Joseph T. Fitzpatrick (D)	City of Norfolk, City of Virginia Beach (part)
1980–1984	Clancy A. Holland (D)	City of Virginia Beach (part)
1984–1988	Clancy A. Holland (D)	City of Virginia Beach (part)
1988–1992	Clancy A. Holland (D)	City of Virginia Beach (part)
1992–1996	Clancy A. Holland (D)	City of Virginia Beach (part)
1996–2000	Ed Schrock (R)	City of Virginia Beach (part)
2000–2001	Ed Schrock (R)	City of Virginia Beach (part)
2001–2004	Frank Wagner (R)	City of Virginia Beach (part)
2004–2008	Frank Wagner (R)	City of Virginia Beach (part)
2008–2012	Frank Wagner (R)	City of Virginia Beach (part)
2012–2016	Frank Wagner (R)	City of Norfolk (part), City of Virginia Beach (part)
2016–2019	Frank Wagner (R)	City of Norfolk (part), City of Virginia Beach (part)
2020–2023	Jen Kiggans (R)	City of Norfolk (part), City of Virginia Beach (part)
2023–2024	Aaron Rouse (D)	City of Norfolk (part), City of Virginia Beach (part)
