= Larkspur, Virginia =

Coordinates: 36°49′13″N 76°08′15″W

Larkspur
- Neighborhood
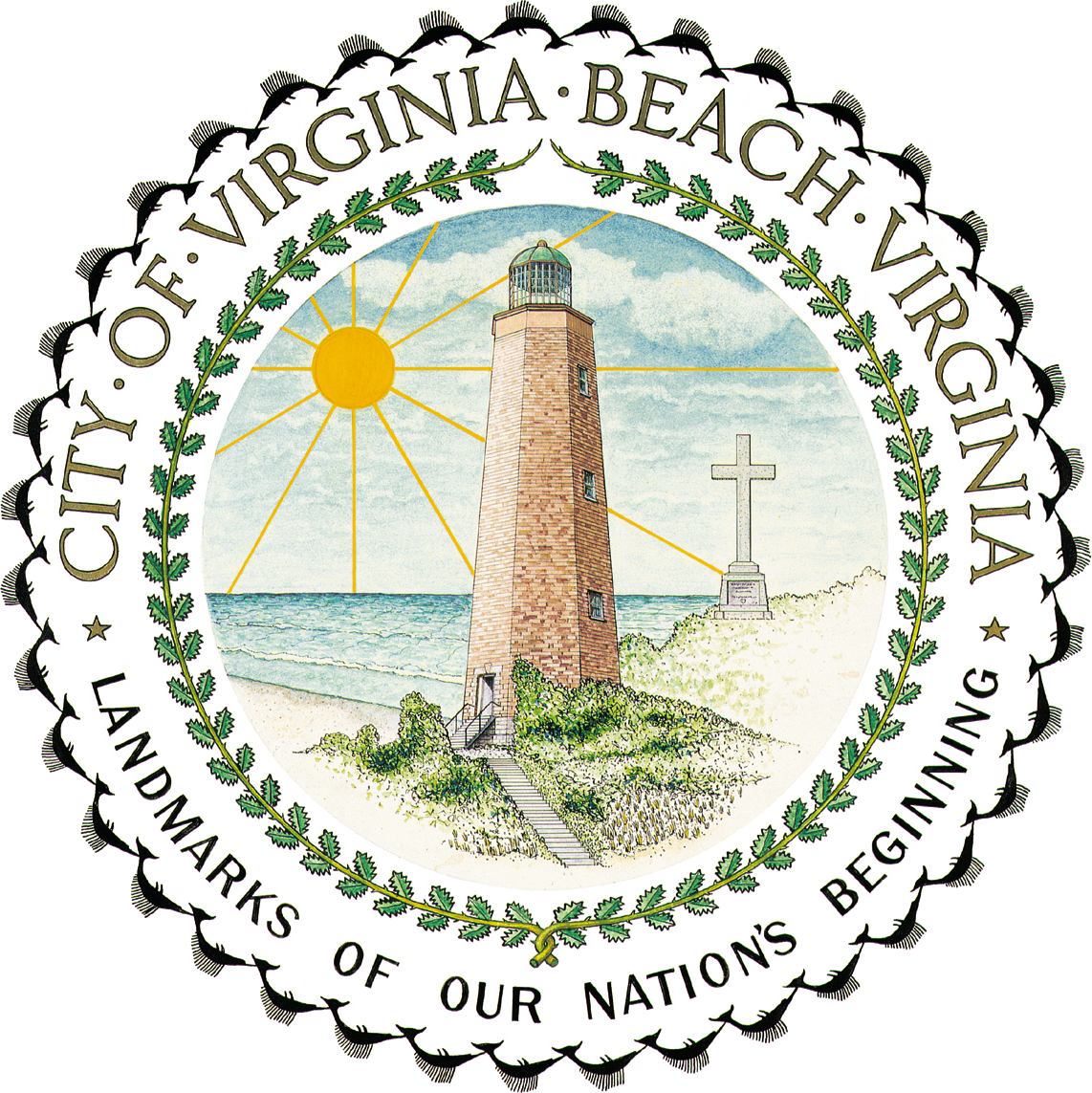
- Seal

- Location within the state of Virginia Larkspur (the United States)
- Country: United States
- State: Virginia
- Independent city: Virginia Beach
- Borough/District: Kempsville
- Time zone: UTC−5 (Eastern (EST))
  - Summer (DST): UTC−4 (EDT)
- ZIP Code: 23462
- Area code: 757

Larkspur is a residential neighborhood in the Kempsville area of the independent city of Virginia Beach, Virginia. The neighborhood was founded by residential developer Clarence Byler in the 1950s after he noticed a new golf course, Kempsville Greens, had opened up near where he had recently been building homes.

== History ==
In the 1950s, residential developer Clarence Byler began developing the neighborhood of Larkspur after noticing the establishment of a new golf course, Kempsville Greens, near Princess Anne Road, where he had recently been building homes. The neighborhood received its name after Byler's friend and attorney Edwin Kellam suggested he name it after the larkspur. Byler would go on to honor his friend further by naming the main thoroughfare through the neighborhood, Edwin Drive. Many of the other streets in the neighborhood were given names that reflected the area's proximity to the golf course. While most of the street names merely reference general golf terms, some of the streets were even named in honor of specific golfers of the time period with names such as Sam Snead Lane, Bob Jones Drive, and Tony Lema Lane.

== Location ==
Larkspur is located in the Kempsville area of Virginia Beach and is within walking distance of Mt. Trashmore Park and about two miles away from Virginia Beach Town Center. Access to Interstate 264 is just a mile away down Independence Boulevard.

== Education ==
The local schools for Larkspur are Kempsville Meadows Elementary, Larkspur Middle School, and Kempsville High School. Kempsville Meadows Elementary is located at the corner of Edwin and Princess Anne; just at the edge of the neighborhood and walking distance for most homes.

== Facilities and amenities ==
Larkspur has a community swimming pool, next door to Kempsville Meadows Elementary, named Larkspur Swim & Racquet Club. One can purchase a summer membership to the facility (for both the pool and racquet club) or join with a social membership, which allows you to attend membership only events as well as other events.

== Civic league ==
Larkspur has its own civic league that is dedicated to building and maintaining the community. The league consists of several committees, including Membership/Hospitality, Newsletter, Website, Programs, and Garden Club. The league also oversees a neighborhood watch for the community as well. Throughout the year, the civic league will issue monthly newsletters and award a "Yard of the Month".
