= Virginia's 4th Senate district =

American legislative district

Virginia's 4th State Senate district
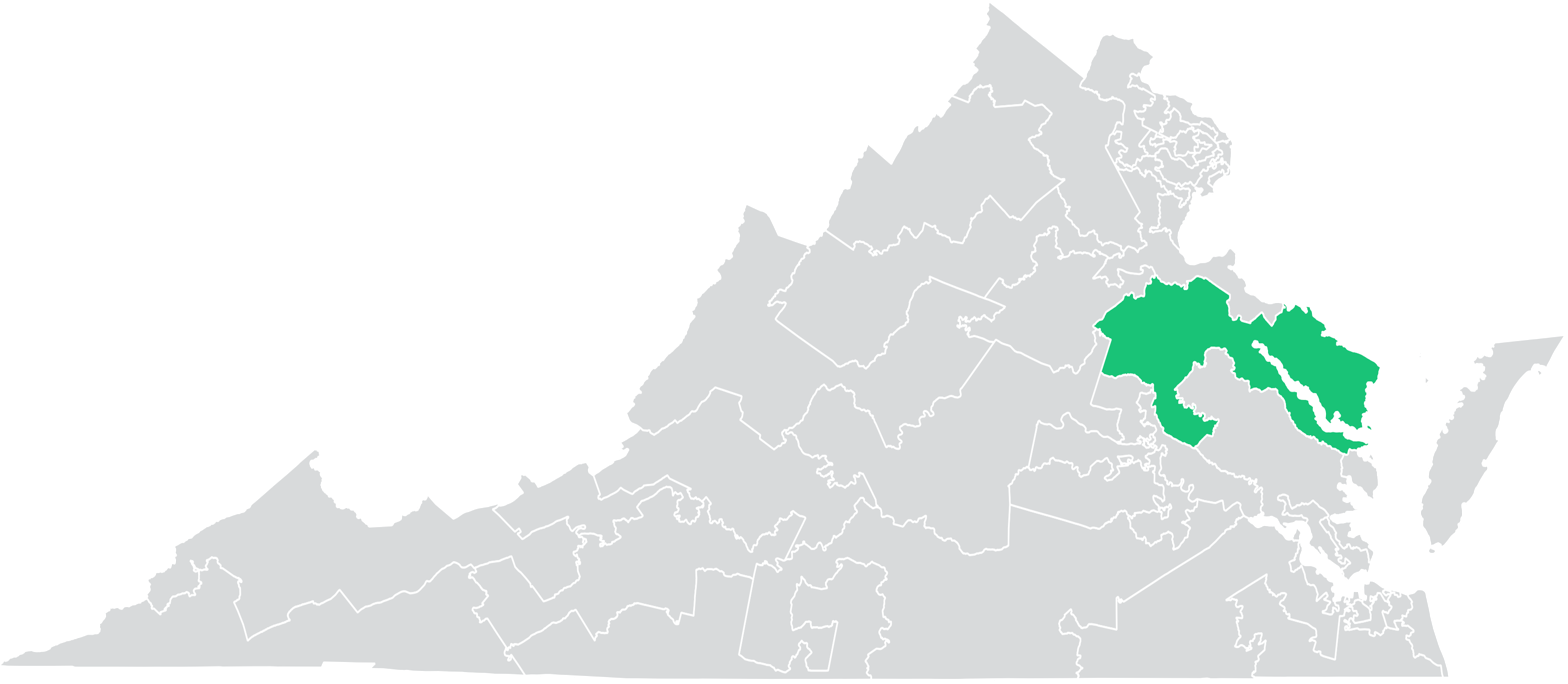
Senator
David Suetterlein; R–Roanoke
- Demographics: 73% White; 18% Black; 4% Hispanic; 1% Asian; 3% Other
- Population (2019): 211,840
- Registered voters: 160,749

Virginia's 4th Senate district is one of 40 districts in the Senate of Virginia. It has been represented by Republican David R. Suetterlein since 2024.

== Geography ==
District 4 is located in southwestern Virginia, including portions of the counties of Montgomery and Roanoke. The independent cities that are part of District 4 include Roanoke and Salem.

The district overlaps with Virginia's 6th and 9th congressional districts, and with the 38th, 39th, 40th, 41st, and 42nd districts of the Virginia House of Delegates.

== Recent election results ==
=== 2019 ===
2019 Virginia Senate election, District 4
Party	Candidate	Votes	%
Republican	Ryan McDougle (incumbent)	45,714	63.0
Democratic	Stan Scott	26,654	36.7
Total votes		72,541	100
Republican hold			

=== 2015 ===
2015 Virginia Senate election, District 4
Party	Candidate	Votes	%
Republican	Ryan McDougle (incumbent)	37,882	96.0
Total votes		39,455	100
Republican hold			

=== 2011 ===
2011 Virginia Senate election, District 4
Party	Candidate	Votes	%
Republican	Ryan McDougle (incumbent)	37,879	97.4
Total votes		38,873	100
Republican hold			

=== Federal and statewide results ===
Year	Office	Results
2020	President	Trump 59.1–39.1%
2017	Governor	Gillespie 60.2–38.7%
2016	President	Trump 59.0–36.4%
2014	Senate	Gillespie 59.8–37.5%
2013	Governor	Cuccinelli 56.4–35.2%
2012	President	Romney 59.1–39.7%
2012	Senate	Allen 58.2–41.8%

== Historical results ==
All election results below took place prior to 2011 redistricting, and thus were under different district lines.

=== 2007 ===
2007 Virginia Senate election, District 4
Party	Candidate	Votes	%
Republican	Ryan McDougle (incumbent)	33,148	98.3
Total votes		33,719	100
Republican hold			

=== 2006 special ===
2006 Virginia Senate special election, District 4
Party	Candidate	Votes	%
Republican	Ryan McDougle	6,822	81.3
Democratic	Roger Cavendish	1,558	18.6
Total votes		8,392	100
Republican hold			

=== 2003 ===
2003 Virginia Senate election, District 4
Primary election
Party	Candidate	Votes	%
Republican	Bill Bolling (incumbent)	27,646	99.4
Total votes		27,801	100
Republican hold			

=== 1999 ===
1999 Virginia Senate election, District 4
Party	Candidate	Votes	%
Republican	Bill Bolling (incumbent)	38,136	99.7
Total votes		38,253	100
Republican hold			

=== 1995 ===
1995 Virginia Senate election, District 4
Party	Candidate	Votes	%
Republican	Bill Bolling	26,957	50.5
Democratic	Elmo G. Cross, Jr. (incumbent)	26,383	49.5
Total votes		53,342	100
Republican gain from Democratic			

== District officeholders since 1940 ==
Years	Senator, District 4	Counties/Cities in District
1940–1944	I. Paul Wailes (D)	Amherst County, Virginia and Nelson County
1944–1948	I. Paul Wailes (D)	Amherst County, Virginia, Bedford County and Nelson County
1948–1952	I. Paul Wailes (D)	Amherst County, Virginia, Bedford County and Nelson County
1952–1956	Walter H. Carter (D)	Amherst County, Virginia, Bedford County and Nelson County
1956–1960	James D. Hagood (D)	Charlotte County, Halifax County, and Prince Edward County
1960–1964	James D. Hagood (D)	Charlotte County, Halifax County, Prince Edward County and the City of South Boston
1964–1966	James D. Hagood (D)	Charlotte County, Halifax County, Prince Edward County and the City of South Boston
1966–1972	James D. Hagood (D)	Charlotte County, Halifax County, Prince Edward County, Lunenburg County, Nottoway County, and the City of South Boston
1972–1976	Leslie D. Campbell Jr. (D)	Charles City County, Gloucester County, Goochland County, Hanover County, King and Queen County, King William County, Louisa County, Mathews County, Middlesex County, and New Kent County
1976–1980	Elmo Cross (D)	Charles City County, Gloucester County, Goochland County, Hanover County, King and Queen County, King William County, Louisa County, Mathews County, Middlesex County, and New Kent County
1980–1984	Elmo Cross (D)	Charles City County, Gloucester County, Goochland County, Hanover County, King and Queen County, King William County, Louisa County, Mathews County, Middlesex County, and New Kent County
1984–1988	Elmo Cross (D)	Charles City County, Gloucester County, Goochland County, Hanover County, King and Queen County, King William County, Louisa County, Mathews County, Middlesex County, and New Kent County
1988–1992	Elmo Cross (D)	Charles City County, Gloucester County, Goochland County, Hanover County, King and Queen County, King William County, Louisa County, Mathews County, Middlesex County, and New Kent County
1992–1996	Elmo Cross (D)	Caroline County, Essex County, Hanover County, King and Queen County, King William County, Middlesex County, and Spotsylvania County (part)
1996–2000	Bill Bolling (R)	Caroline County, Essex County, Hanover County, King and Queen County, King William County, Middlesex County, and Spotsylvania County (part)
2000–2004	Bill Bolling (R)	Caroline County, Essex County, Hanover County, King and Queen County, King William County, Middlesex County, and Spotsylvania County (part)
2004–2008	Bill Bolling (R)	Caroline County, Essex County, Hanover County, King and Queen County Middlesex County, and Spotsylvania County (part)
2004–2008	Ryan McDougle (R)	Caroline County, Essex County, Hanover County, King and Queen County Middlesex County, and Spotsylvania County (part)
2008–2012	Ryan McDougle (R)	Caroline County, Essex County, Hanover County, King and Queen County Middlesex County, and Spotsylvania County (part)
2012–2016	Ryan McDougle (R)	Caroline County, Essex County, Lancaster County, Middlesex County, Northumberland County, Richmond County, Hanover County (part), King George County (part), Spotsylvania County (part) and Westmoreland County (part)
2016–present	Ryan McDougle (R)	Caroline County, Essex County, Lancaster County, Middlesex County, Northumberland County, Richmond County, Hanover County (part), King George County (part), Spotsylvania County (part) and Westmoreland County (part)
