= Virginia's 97th House of Delegates district =

Virginia legislative district

Virginia's 97th State House of Delegates district
- District map from the 2023 election
Delegate
Michael Feggans; D
- Demographics: 57.8% White; 20.6% Black; 9.3% Hispanic; 7.3% Asian; 3.9% Other
- Population (2020): 86,577
- Registered voters (2024): 63,024

Virginia's 97th House of Delegates district elects one of the 100 members of the Virginia House of Delegates, the lower house of the state's bicameral legislature. The district is located in the Virginia Beach area.

The 97th district has been represented by Democrat Michael Feggans since 2024.

== List of delegates ==
Delegate	Party	Years	Electoral history
Edwin H. Ragsdale	Republican	January 12, 1983 – January 11, 1984	Lost reelection
George W. Grayson	Democratic	January 11, 1984 – January 9, 2002	Did not seek reelection
Ryan McDougle	Republican	January 9, 2002 – January 11, 2006	Won election to Senate
Chris Peace	Republican	January 25, 2006 – January 8, 2020	Lost renomination
Scott Wyatt	Republican	January 8, 2020 – January 10, 2024	First elected in 2019. Redistricted to the 60th in 2023.
Michael Feggans	Democratic	January 10, 2024 – present	First elected in 2023.
