= Senator Parker =

Senator Parker may refer to:

== Members of the United States Senate ==
- Nahum Parker (1760–1839), U.S. Senator from New Hampshire
- Richard E. Parker (1783–1840), U.S. Senator from Virginia

== United States state senate members ==
- Abraham X. Parker (1831–1909), New York State Senate
- Alban J. Parker (1893–1971), Vermont State Senate
- Amasa J. Parker Jr. (1843–1938), New York State Senate
- Barry T. Parker (born 1932), New Jersey State Senate
- David Parker (Mississippi politician) (born 1969), Mississippi State Senate
- Edward Griffin Parker (1825–1868), Massachusetts State Senate
- Fordis C. Parker (1868–1945), Massachusetts State Senate
- James Parker (Massachusetts politician) (1768–1837), Massachusetts State Senate
- John Francis Parker (1907–1992), Massachusetts State Senate
- Kathy Parker (born 1943), Illinois State Senate
- Kevin Parker (New York politician) (born 1967), New York State Senate
- Lester T. Parker (1900–1974), Washington State Senate
- Marshall Parker (1922–2008), South Carolina State Senate
- Scudder Parker (born 1943), Vermont State Senate
- Severn E. Parker (1787–1836), Virginia State Senate
- Tan Parker (born 1971), Texas State Senate
- William T. Parker (1928–2014), Virginia State Senate

== See also ==
- Elizabeth Bennett-Parker (fl. 2020s), Virginia State Senate
