= 2014 Virginia elections =

- November 4, 2014

A general election was held in Virginia on November 4, 2014.

== Federal ==
- 2014 United States House of Representatives elections in Virginia
- 2014 Virginia's 7th congressional district special election
- 2014 United States Senate election in Virginia

== Local ==
- 2014 Norfolk mayoral election

== See also ==
- Elections in Virginia
