= 2012 Virginia elections =

- November 6, 2012

Virginia state elections in 2012 was held on Tuesday, November 6, 2012. In addition to the U.S. presidential race, Virginia voters will elect their Class I U.S. senator and all of its seats to the House of Representatives.

== President ==
Mitt Romney won the Virginia Republican primary with 59.5% of the vote compared to the Ron Paul's 40.5%.

Later in the year Romney went on to stand against Barack Obama as a Republican in the 2012 US presidential election however Romney failed to secure the state's seat, losing out to Democratic candidate Barack Obama who gained 51.1% of the Virginian vote.

== House of Representatives ==
In the 2012 US House of Representatives election, the Republican party defeated the Democrats winning 8 out of the 11 districts up for election compared to the Democrats 3.

== Senate ==
In the 2012 US Senate election, Virginians elected Democrat Tim Kaine with 52.5% of votes in favor of Kaine and 47.5% in favor of Republican George F. Allen.

== House of Delegates ==
In a special general election, Democrats K. Rob Krupicka and Daun Sessoms Hester were elected to the House of Delegates with 75.7% of the vote and 93.5% respectively.
