= Kacey Carnegie =

American politician

Member of the Virginia House of Delegates from the 89th district
- Incumbent
- Assumed office January 14, 2026
- Preceded by: Baxter Ennis

Personal details
- Born: 1983 or 1984 (age 42–43) Chesapeake, Virginia, U.S.
- Party: Democratic
- Spouse: Adam
- Children: 2
- Education: Longwood University; University of Richmond School of Law

Karen Robins "Kacey" Carnegie is an American attorney and politician who was elected member of the Virginia House of Delegates in 2025. A member of the Democratic Party, she previously worked as a lawyer.

== Early life and career ==
Carnegie was born and raised in Chesapeake, Virginia and graduated from Deep Creek High School. She then graduated summa cum laude from Longwood University with a degree in accounting and sociology in 2004 and cum laude from the T.C. Williams School of Law (now known as the University of Richmond School of Law) in 2008.

She is a probate attorney and started her own firm in September 2012.

== Personal life ==
Carnegie has been married to her husband, Suffolk-native Adam, for 17 years as of 2026 and they have two daughters.

== Political career ==
=== Virginia House of Delegates ===
Carnegie was elected to represent Virginia's 89th House of Delegates district in 2025, succeeding retiring Republican Delegate Baxter Ennis.

During her first term, Carnegie sponsored several bills that were enacted into law. House Bill 306 revised deadlines for claims to family, homestead, and exempt-property allowances in the administration of estates. House Bill 307 established a procedure allowing personal representatives of estates to provide notice to potential creditors and set timelines for claims against a decedent's estate. Carnegie also co-sponsored House Bill 567, which amended provisions governing access to aggregated court case data by attorneys for the Commonwealth. In addition, she sponsored House Bill 716, a tax-relief measure.

== Electoral history ==
=== 2025 election ===
Virginia's 89th House of Delegates District, 2025 General Election
Party	Candidate	Votes	%
Democratic	Karen Robins "Kacey" Carnegie	20,582	54.60
Republican	Michael K. "Mike" Lamonea	17,036	45.19
Write-in		80	0.21
Total votes		38,270	100
Democratic gain from Republican			
