= J. Samuel Glasscock =

American attorney and politician (1931–2024)

Sam Glasscock

Member of the Virginia House of Delegates
- In office January 14, 1970 – January 8, 1992
- Preceded by: J. Lewis Rawls Jr.
- Succeeded by: Robert Nelms
- Constituency: 47th district (1970‍–‍1972); 43rd district (1972‍–‍1982); 41st district (1982‍–‍1983); 76th district (1983‍–‍1992)

Personal details
- Born: James Samuel Glasscock; November 19, 1931 Springton, West Virginia, U.S.
- Died: June 24, 2024 (aged 92)
- Party: Democratic
- Spouse: Betty
- Education: Hampden–Sydney College; University of Virginia
- Occupation: Attorney

James Samuel Glasscock (November 19, 1931 – June 24, 2024) was an American attorney and politician who served as a member of the Virginia House of Delegates from 1970 to 1991. He died on June 24, 2024, at the age of 92.

== Early life and legal career ==
Glasscock was born in Springton, West Virginia, and moved with his family to the Chuckatuck area of Suffolk, Virginia, where he later lived on a farm.

== Political career ==
By 1984, Glasscock was chairman of the House Committee on Health, Welfare and Institutions.

In the mid-1980s, he sponsored legislation to require safety belt use in Virginia. During the 1986 debate, he objected to limiting seat-belt citations to stops made for other offenses. A Virginia Transportation Research Council study on mandatory seat-belt use was initiated at his request and proposed model legislation for inclusion in the Code of Virginia.
