= Dott =

Dott may refer to:

- Dott, Pennsylvania
- Dott, West Virginia
- Graeme Dott (born 1977), Scottish snooker player
- Marie-Luise Dött (born 1953), German politician
- Stefan Dott (born 1969), German judoka
- Designs of the Time, a Design Council programme to improve national life
- Dott (transportation company)
- Dott Services, a Ugandan engineering and construction company
- Day of the Tentacle, a computer game by LucasArts
