= Brouillet (surname) =

Brouillet is a French surname. Notable people with the surname include:

- Chrystine Brouillet (born 1958), Canadian writer
- Frank Brouillet (1928–2001), American politician
- Luc Brouillet (born 1954), Canadian botanist
- Raymond Brouillet (born 1933), Canadian politician
