= Peter K. Babalas =

American politician (1922–1987)

Member of the Virginia Senate from the 5th district
- In office January 12, 1972 – December 29, 1987; 5th/6th/7th: January 12, 1972 – January 11, 1984
- Preceded by: William V. Rawlings
- Succeeded by: Yvonne B. Miller

Member of the Virginia Senate from the 2nd district
- In office January 10, 1968 – January 12, 1972
- Preceded by: Robert F. Baldwin
- Succeeded by: Herbert H. Bateman

Personal details
- Born: Peter Kostas Babalas; July 8, 1922 Boston, Massachusetts, U.S.
- Died: December 29, 1987 (aged 65) Virginia Beach, Virginia, U.S.
- Party: Democratic
- Education: Harvard University (AB); University of Virginia (LLB)

Military service
- Allegiance: United States
- Branch/service: United States Army
- Rank: First lieutenant
- Battles/wars: World War II; Korean War

Peter Kostas Babalas (July 8, 1922 – December 29, 1987) was a Virginia lawyer and politician who served in the Virginia Senate from 1968 until 1987.

== Early and family life ==
Born in Boston, Massachusetts and educated at Harvard College, his undergraduate education was interrupted by World War II, in which Babalas served as a first Lieutenant in the U.S. Army Infantry before receiving his undergraduate A.B. degree in 1945. He then attended the University of Virginia School of Law and graduated in 1950.

He married Lillie Macheras and would be recalled to military service during the Korean War. He was active in his Greek Orthodox Church, as well as other civic organizations including the Masons, Shrine (Khedive), Elks, Civitan, Knights of Pythias and American Legion.

== Career ==
After admission to the Virginia Bar, Babalas practiced law in the Norfolk and Virginia Beach area.

He was first elected to the Virginia Senate (a part-time position) in 1967, representing Norfolk City and the Northwestern part of the city of Virginia Beach, then known as District 2. He succeeded fellow Democrat Robert F. Baldwin, who had represented the district since 1962.

In 1971, a federal court order consolidated three Norfolk and Virginia Beach senatorial districts into one three-member district, and the legislature also reorganized districts based on the 1970 census results.

Babalas, Stanley C. Walker and Thomas R. Walker, all Democrats, represented the three-member district during much of the 1970s. The district was renumbered the 6th senatorial district, the previous long term incumbent of that numbered district (but actually counties considerably west of Norfolk, Garland Gray having retired, but he had represented a district west of Norfolk, and his son Elmon T. Gray succeeded to what had been his district, now renumbered the 16th Senatorial District.

Babalas announced his pending retirement on March 3, 1987, shortly after a legislative session which debated ethics reforms and in which his name was often mentioned. A state senate ethics panel had censured Babalas for voting in 1985 for measures which favored one of his legal clients, Landbank Equity Corp., which went bankrupt, but the censure contained no penalties (Babalas retained his chairmanship of the powerful Rules Committee) and only resulted in a referral to Virginia's attorney general.

Babalas had been charged with two misdeaneanors with respect to that vote, but one charge was dismissed during the 1986 trial, and he was acquitted of the other charge. Babalas died of bone marrow cancer on December 29, 1987, in Virginia Beach, Virginia at age 65.
