= Daun Hester =

American politician

Daun Sessoms Hester

Member of the Virginia House of Delegates from the 89th district
- In office December 20, 2012 – January 10, 2018
- Preceded by: Kenny Alexander
- Succeeded by: Jay Jones

Personal details
- Born: October 7, 1955 (age 70) Norfolk, Virginia, U.S.
- Party: Democratic
- Spouse: Quincey Hester Sr.
- Children: 2
- Education: Virginia State University; George Washington University
- Profession: Teacher, Educator
- Committees: Education; Privileges and Elections
- Website: daunhester.org

Daun Sessoms Hester (born October 7, 1955) is an American politician and educator. She served on the nonpartisan Norfolk, Virginia City Council 1996–2010, and was vice mayor 2004–08. She was a Democratic member of the Virginia House of Delegates, having won a special election on December 18, 2012, in the 89th district in Norfolk. She then became the Treasurer of Norfolk in 2018.

== Early life, education, family ==
Hester was born in Norfolk and grew up in the Five Points neighborhood, graduating from Norview High School. She received a Bachelor of Science degree in education from Virginia State University in 1978 and a Master of Arts in education and human development from George Washington University in 1990.

Hester worked for Norfolk Public Schools for 22 years.

== Electoral history ==
Date	Election	Candidate	Party	Votes	%
Virginia House of Delegates, 89th district
December 18, 2012	Special	Daun Sessoms Hester	Democratic	1,123	93.50
December 18, 2012	Special	James J. St. John		68	5.66
December 18, 2012	Special	Write Ins		10	0.83
December 18, 2012	Special	Kenny Alexander resigned; seat remained Democratic			

== Political career ==
Hester was first elected to Norfolk City Council in 1996, representing Superward 7. In 2004, she was chosen as vice mayor by her fellow council members, holding that position until 2008. In 2010, she ran for mayor against the incumbent, Paul D. Fraim, and two other challengers, losing to Fraim, 64% to 30%. After losing the election, she resigned her council seat.

State Senator Yvonne B. Miller died in July 2012, creating an opening in the 5th Senate district. Delegate Kenneth Cooper Alexander won her seat in a September 4 special election, creating another vacancy in the 89th House district. Hester defeated Yvonne Allmond, a banker, 840–290 in a Democratic party firehouse primary on October 17. Hester then defeated James J. St. John, an independent, in the special election on December 18.
