= Tom Forehand =

American politician

Member of the Virginia House of Delegates
- In office January 9, 1980 – June 25, 1993
- Preceded by: William T. Parker
- Succeeded by: Lionell Spruill
- Constituency: 38th district (1980‍–‍1982); 36th district (1982‍–‍1983); 77th district (1983‍–‍1993)

Personal details
- Born: Vernon Thomas Forehand Jr. August 19, 1947 Norfolk, Virginia, U.S.
- Died: August 19, 2014 (aged 67) South Norfolk, Virginia, U.S.
- Party: Democratic
- Education: Haverford College (BA); University of Richmond (JD)

Vernon Thomas Forehand Jr. (August 19, 1947 – August 19, 2014) was an American lawyer and politician who served as a member of the Virginia House of Delegates from 1980 to 1993. He later served as a judge.
