= Catherine Dean May =

American politician from Washington State (1914–2004)

Catherine May
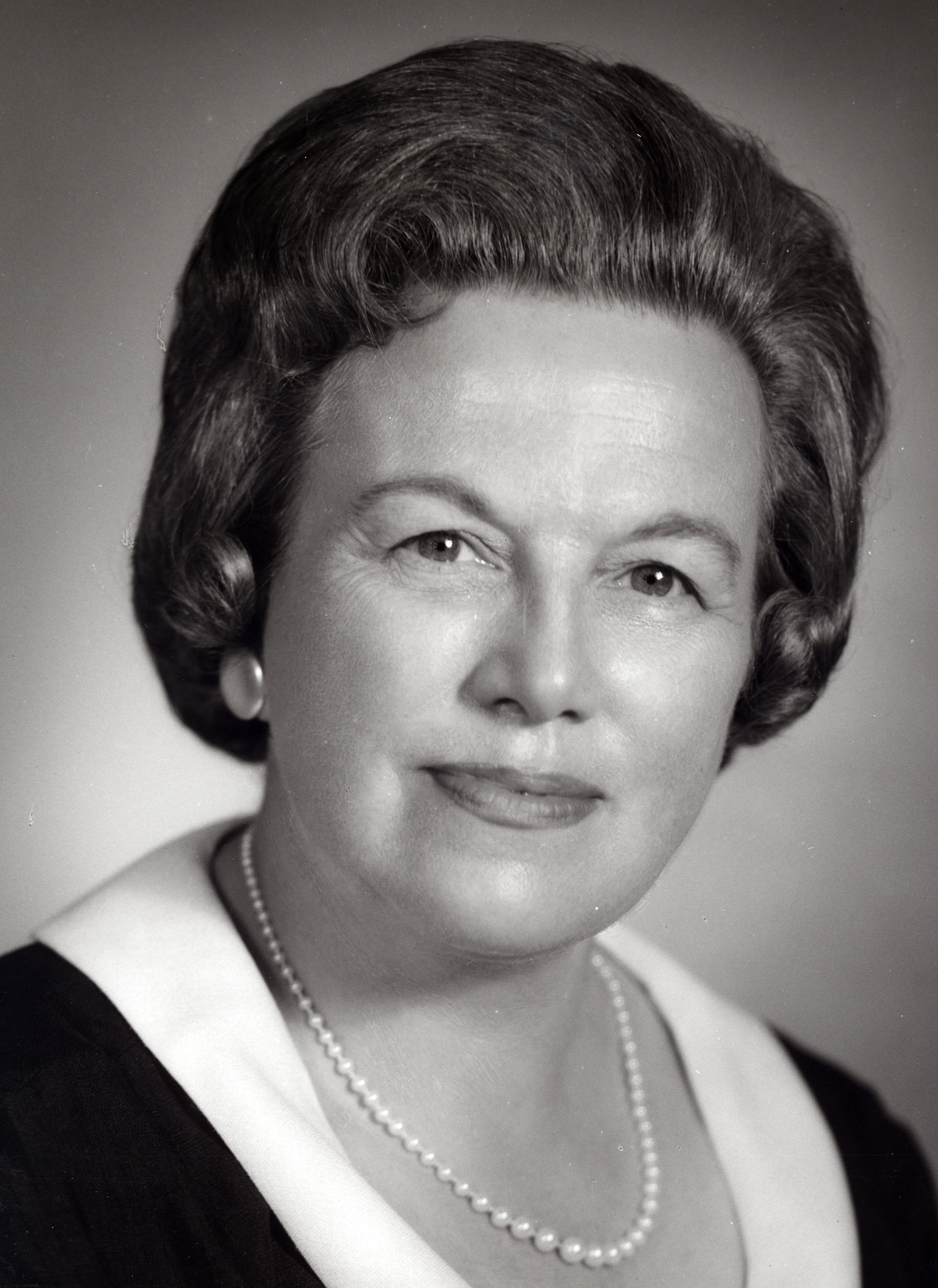

Member of the U.S. House of Representatives from Washington's 4th district
- In office January 3, 1959 – January 3, 1971
- Preceded by: Hal Holmes
- Succeeded by: Mike McCormack

Member of the Washington House of Representatives for the 14th district
- In office January 1953 – January 1959

Personal details
- Born: Catherine Dean Barnes; May 18, 1914 Yakima, Washington, U.S.
- Died: May 28, 2004 (aged 90) Rancho Mirage, California, U.S.
- Party: Republican
- Education: Yakima Valley College (AA); University of Washington (BS); University of Southern California (attended)

Catherine Dean May (May 18, 1914 – May 28, 2004) was a U.S. representative from Washington. She was the first woman elected to Congress in the state of Washington.

== Early life, education, and career ==
May was born as Catherine Dean Barnes in Yakima, Washington, and graduated from Yakima Valley Junior College, in 1934. She earned her B.S. from the University of Washington in 1936 with a major in English and her teaching certificate in 1937. She briefly attended the University of Southern California in 1939, studying speech.

She taught English at Chehalis High School from 1937 to 1940 and was women's editor and a news broadcaster in Tacoma, Washington, in 1941 and 1942. She headed the radio department for a Seattle advertising agency from 1942 to 1943, and a Seattle insurance company from 1943 to 1944. She then became a writer and assistant commentator for the National Broadcasting Company in New York City from 1944 to 1946 before returning to the Northwest to become women's editor at station KIT in Yakima from 1948 to 1957. She worked as an office manager and medical secretary at the Yakima Medical Center in 1957 and 1958 and served as president of Bedell Associates.

== Political career ==
May served as a member of the Washington State House of Representatives from 1953 to 1959.

In 1958, May was elected as a Republican to the Eighty-sixth United States Congress. She was subsequently re-elected five times, serving from January 3, 1959, until January 3, 1971. She was the first woman elected to Congress from Washington. While in Congress, May served on the House Agriculture Committee, the House Beauty Shop Committee, and the Joint Committee on Atomic Energy. May voted in favor of the Civil Rights Act of 1960, Civil Rights Acts of 1964, and the Civil Rights Act of 1968. She also voted in favor of the 24th Amendment to the U.S. Constitution but did not vote on the Voting Rights Act of 1965.

Upon her marriage to Donald W. Bedell on November 14, 1970, she was known as Catherine May Bedell.

She was an unsuccessful candidate for reelection to the Ninety-second Congress in 1970 and subsequently served on the United States International Trade Commission from 1971 to 1975 and again from 1979 through 1980. In 1982, she was a Special Consultant to the President on the 50 States Project. In 2004, she was the president of Bedell Associates in Palm Desert, California.

She died on May 28, 2004, in Rancho Mirage, California.

== See also ==
- Women in the United States House of Representatives

U.S. House of Representatives
Preceded by Hal Holmes	Member of the U.S. House of Representatives from Washington's 4th congressional district 1959–1971	Succeeded by Mike McCormack
