= Elmer Hyppa =

American politician from Washington

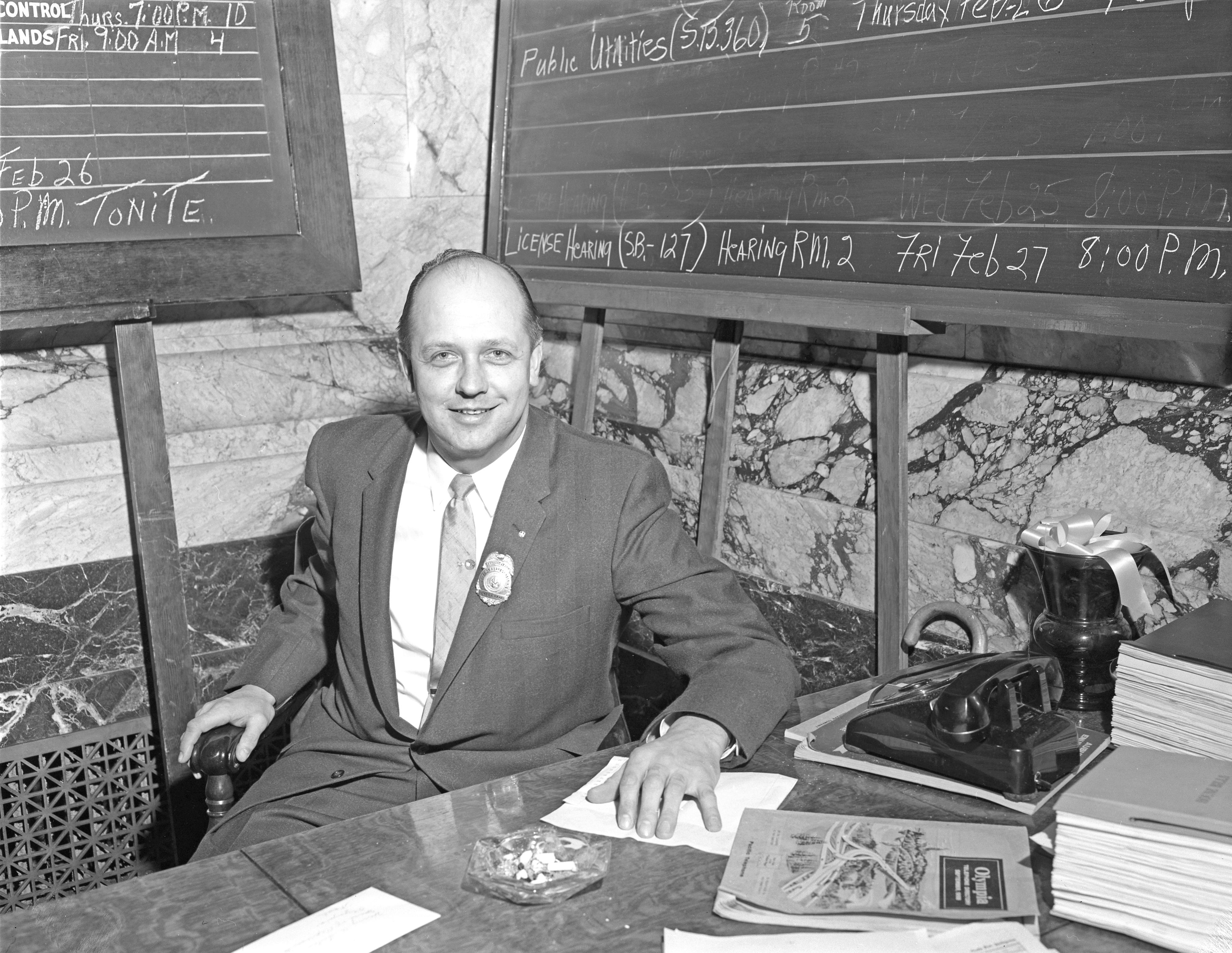
- Hyppa in 1959

Member of the Washington House of Representatives from the 25th district
- In office January 12, 1953 – January 14, 1957
- Preceded by: Reuben Knoblauch
- Succeeded by: Frank Brouillet

Personal details
- Born: February 7, 1919 Wilkeson, Washington, U.S.
- Died: January 11, 2001 (aged 81) Buckley, Washington, U.S.
- Party: Democratic

Elmer A. Hyppa (February 7, 1919 – January 11, 2001) was an American politician from Buckley, Washington. He served in the Washington House of Representatives from 1953 to 1957. He was also the Sergeants at Arms of the House of Representatives from 1957 to 1967.
