= Victor Zednick =

American politician

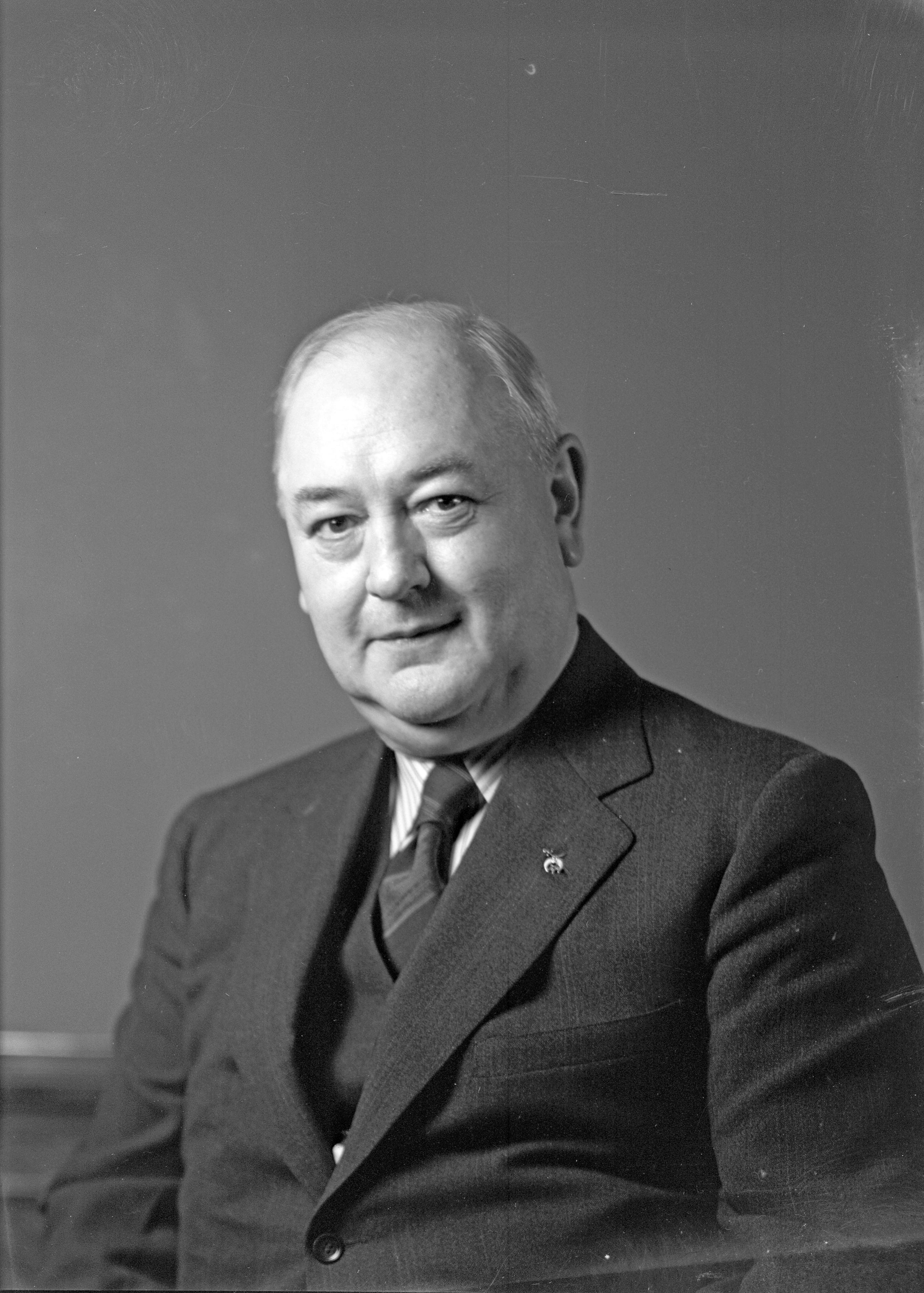
- Zednick in 1943

President pro tempore of the Washington Senate
- In office January 12, 1953 – January 14, 1957
- Preceded by: Ted F. Schroeder
- Succeeded by: Edward F. Riley
- In office January 13, 1947 – January 10, 1949
- Preceded by: Carl C. Mohler
- Succeeded by: Lester T. Parker

Member of the Washington House of Representatives for the 43rd district
- In office 1911–1919

Member of the Washington State Senate for the 36th district
- In office 1943–1959

Secretary of the Washington Senate
- In office January 13, 1919 – January 14, 1929
- Preceded by: Frank M. Dallan Jr.
- Succeeded by: Herbert H. Sieler

Personal details
- Born: December 25, 1884 Denver, Colorado, U.S.
- Died: April 15, 1959 (aged 74) Seattle, Washington, U.S.
- Party: Republican

Victor Zednick (December 25, 1884 – April 15, 1959) was an American politician in the state of Washington. He served in the Washington House of Representatives and Washington State Senate.

Washington State Senate
Preceded by Ted F. Schroeder	President pro tempore of the Washington Senate; 1953–1957	Succeeded by Edward F. Riley
