= Baxter Ennis =

American politician from Virginia

Member of the Virginia House of Delegates from the 89th district
- Incumbent
- Assumed office January 10, 2024
- Preceded by: Jackie Glass (redistricting)

Personal details
- Party: Republican

N. Baxter Ennis is an American Republican politician from Virginia. He was elected to the Virginia House of Delegates in the 2023 Virginia House of Delegates election from the 89th district.

Ennis served 21 years in the United States Army including participation in Desert Shield/Desert Storm before retiring as a lieutenant colonel.
