= Virginia's 89th House of Delegates district =

Virginia legislative district

District map from the 2023 election

Virginia's 89th House of Delegates district elects one of 100 seats in the Virginia House of Delegates, the lower house of the state's bicameral legislature. District 89, consisting of parts of Chesapeake and Suffolk, is currently represented by Democrat Kacey Carnegie.

== Elections ==
District 89 was represented by Daun Hester from 2013, after she won a 2012 special election. In 2017, Hester stepped down to run for Norfolk City Treasurer, and Jerrauld "Jay" Jones (son of Jerrauld C. Jones, who held the seat for eight terms) ran for the seat. Joe Dillard, president of the Norfolk NAACP, also ran, as did Libertarian Terry Hurst.

In 2021, following the announcement that Jay Jones and his wife are expecting their first child in summer 2022, he resigned. Jackie Glass won the special election for the seat.

== District officeholders ==
| Years | Delegate | Party | Notes |
|---|---|---|---|
| January 12, 1983 – January 11, 1984 | Bob Washington | Democratic | Did not seek reelection |
| January 11, 1984 – January 13, 1988 | Yvonne B. Miller | Democratic | First African-American woman to be elected to the state house |
| January 13, 1988 – June 5, 2002 | Jerrauld Jones | Democratic | |
| August 2002 – September 17, 2012 | Kenny Alexander | Democratic | |
| December 20, 2012 – January 10, 2018 | Daun Hester | Democratic | Elected in a special election |
| January 10, 2018 – December 31, 2021 | Jay Jones | Democratic | First elected in 2017 Resigned in 2021 |
| January 12, 2022 – January 10, 2024 | Jackie Glass | Democratic | Elected in a special election |
| January 10, 2024 – January 14, 2026 | Baxter Ennis | Republican | First elected in 2023 |
| January 14, 2026 – present | Kacey Carnegie | Democratic | First elected in 2025 |
