= Virginia's 77th House of Delegates district =

Virginia legislative district

District map from the 2023 election

Virginia's 77th House of Delegates district elects one of 100 seats in the Virginia House of Delegates, the lower house of the state's bicameral legislature. District 77 is in Chesapeake and Suffolk. Cliff Hayes Jr. represented the district. For the 2019 election, Delegate Hayes ran against Ron Wallace, the Republican candidate from Chesapeake.

== District officeholders ==
Years	Delegate	Party	Electoral history
January 12, 1983 – June 25, 1993	Tom Forehand	Democratic	Resigned
January 12, 1994 – January 10, 2017	Lionell Spruill	Democratic	Resigned; Elected to the Senate of Virginia
January 10, 2017 – 2024	Cliff Hayes Jr.	Democratic	Elected via special election
January 10, 2024 – December 9, 2025	Michael Jones	Democratic	Resigned
2026 – present	Charlie Schmidt	Democratic	Elected via special election
