= Jerrauld Jones =

American politician (1954–2025)

- Jerrauld Corey Jones in judicial robes

Member of the Virginia House of Delegates from the 89th district
- In office January 13, 1988 – June 5, 2002
- Preceded by: Yvonne B. Miller
- Succeeded by: Kenny Alexander

Personal details
- Born: Jerrauld Corey Jones; July 22, 1954 Norfolk, Virginia, U.S.
- Died: May 31, 2025 (aged 70)
- Party: Democratic
- Spouse: Lyn Simmons
- Children: Jay Jones
- Education: Princeton University (BA); Washington & Lee University (JD)
- Profession: Lawyer

Jerrauld Corey Jones (July 22, 1954 – May 31, 2025) was an American politician and jurist. He was a Democratic member of the Virginia House of Delegates from 1988 to 2002, representing the 89th District in Norfolk. In 2002, Jones was made Director of the Department of Juvenile Justice under Governor Mark Warner. He then served as a judge as a judge in the Norfolk Juvenile and Domestic Relations District Court, before ultimately becoming a judge of the Norfolk Circuit Court. He remains one of few people in Virginia history to serve in all three branches of state government. He was also a second generation member of his family to have served in politics, including at the statewide level.

== Early life ==
Jones was one of three sons born to Hilary Jones Jr., his father, and Corinne Davis Jones, his mother. Jones' father was a prominent African-American lawyer in Norfolk during the 1950s, the era of massive resistance to school integration in Virginia, and who also became the first Black person to serve as a member of the Norfolk School Board. His mother was a school teacher who was also instrumental in Norfolk school integration. In 1961, under their mother's guidance, young Jerrauld and his brother Hilary III both integrated Ingleside Elementary School in Norfolk. In 1967, he went on to integrate the private Virginia Episcopal School in Lynchburg. In 1969, Hilary Jones Jr. was appointed to the Virginia state Board of Education, becoming the first Black person to be named to the board in the history of Virginia.

Jones received a B.A. degree cum laude from Princeton University in 1976. In 1980 he graduated from the Washington and Lee University School of Law with a J.D. degree. That same year, he became the first African-American law clerk to the Supreme Court of Virginia. He subsequently returned to Norfolk and served as an Assistant Commonwealth's Attorney for two years before opening up a private law practice. He remained in private practice until 2002, when he became Director of Juvenile Justice.

== Political career ==
In 1987, Jones was elected to the Virginia House of Delegates from the 89th District when the incumbent, Yvonne Miller, chose to run for the state senate instead. He was reelected seven times, and eventually became a member of the Rules Committee.

In 2001, Jones ran in the Democratic primary for Lieutenant Governor of Virginia. He finished third behind the eventual winner, Richmond Mayor Tim Kaine, and Delegate Alan Diamonstein of Newport News. Following this defeat, he ran for reelection to the House, winning his eighth term in November.

In June 2002, Governor Mark Warner appointed Jones state Director of Juvenile Justice until 2005. In this capacity he oversaw all adjudicated youths in the juvenile detention system in Virginia.

== Judicial career ==
In 2005, then-Governor Warner appointed Jones a judge of the Norfolk Juvenile and Domestic Relations Court. In October 2008, Governor Kaine appointed him to fill a vacancy on the Norfolk Circuit Court. Jones was elected to a full eight-year term by the legislature during the 2009 General Assembly session and re-elected for a second 8-year term during the 2017 General Assembly session. Amid ongoing health issues, Jones opted to retire from the Norfolk Circuit Court in 2024. Jones' widow Lyn, who was still his wife at the time of his, currently serves in the Norfolk circuit court as well, serving as the Chief Judge of the Norfolk Juvenile and Domestic Relations District Court.

== Death ==
Jones died May 31, 2025, at the age of 70. In November 2025, Jones would be honored by his son Jay in his victory speech after winning the 2025 Virginia Attorney General election. His widow Lyn, herself a judge, would afterwards swear their son Jay, who became the first Black Virginia Attorney General, into office on January 17, 2026. On March 4, 2026, a Virginia Senate resolution honoring Jones would be introduced by Virginia state senator R. Creigh Deeds and soon afterwards get passed by the Virginia Senate on March 10, 2026.
