= Carl C. Mohler =

American politician

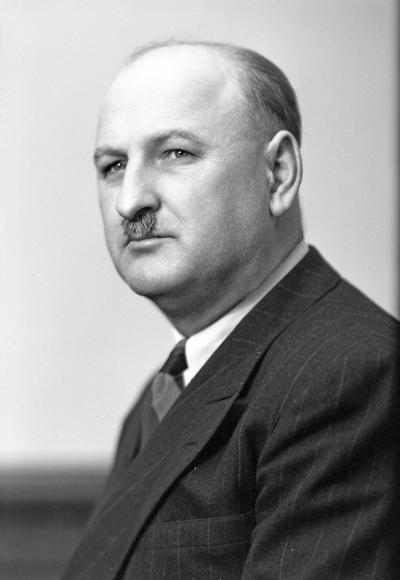
- Mohler in 1947

President pro tempore of the Washington Senate
- In office January 8, 1945 – January 13, 1947
- Preceded by: Albert Rosellini
- Succeeded by: Victor Zednick

Member of the Washington Senate from the 22nd district
- In office January 13, 1941 – January 10, 1949
- Preceded by: Harold P. Troy
- Succeeded by: Carlton I. Sears

Member of the Washington House of Representatives from the 22nd district
- In office January 9, 1939 – January 13, 1941
- Preceded by: Mert Francis
- Succeeded by: Ralph L. J. Armstrong

Personal details
- Born: Carl Charles Mohler; December 26, 1898 Minnesota, U.S.
- Died: January 27, 1969 (aged 70) North Hollywood, Los Angeles, California, U.S.
- Party: Democratic

Carl Charles Mohler (December 26, 1898 – January 27, 1969) was an American politician in the state of Washington. He served in the Washington State Senate and Washington House of Representatives. From 1945 to 1949, he was President pro tempore of the Senate.

Washington State Senate
Preceded by Albert Rosellini	President pro tempore of the Washington Senate; 1945–1947	Succeeded by Victor Zednick
