= Willis E. Cohoon =

American attorney and politician

Member of the Virginia House of Delegates for Nansemond and Suffolk City
- In office December 1952 – November 28, 1960
- Preceded by: Mills Godwin
- Succeeded by: J. Lewis Rawls Jr.
- In office January 10, 1940 – January 14, 1948
- Preceded by: E. Jordan Taylor
- Succeeded by: Mills Godwin

Personal details
- Born: Willis Everett Cohoon; April 8, 1902 Montgomery, Alabama, U.S.
- Died: November 28, 1960 (aged 58) Suffolk, Virginia, U.S.
- Party: Democratic
- Spouse: Thelma Lee Bryant
- Education: Auburn University; Virginia Military Institute

Willis Everett Cohoon (April 8, 1902 – November 28, 1960) was an American attorney and politician who served as a member of the House of Delegates.

== Memberships/Affiliations History ==
Membership/Affiliation
Episcopal Church American Legion Elks Masons Shrine Suffolk-Nansemond County Bar Association	President	1947
Virginia Bar Association	Vice President	1947
Virginia Advisory Legislative Council		1944-48
Virginia Recodification Commission	Chairman	1944-48
