= Kenny Alexander =

American politician, current mayor of Norfolk, Virginia

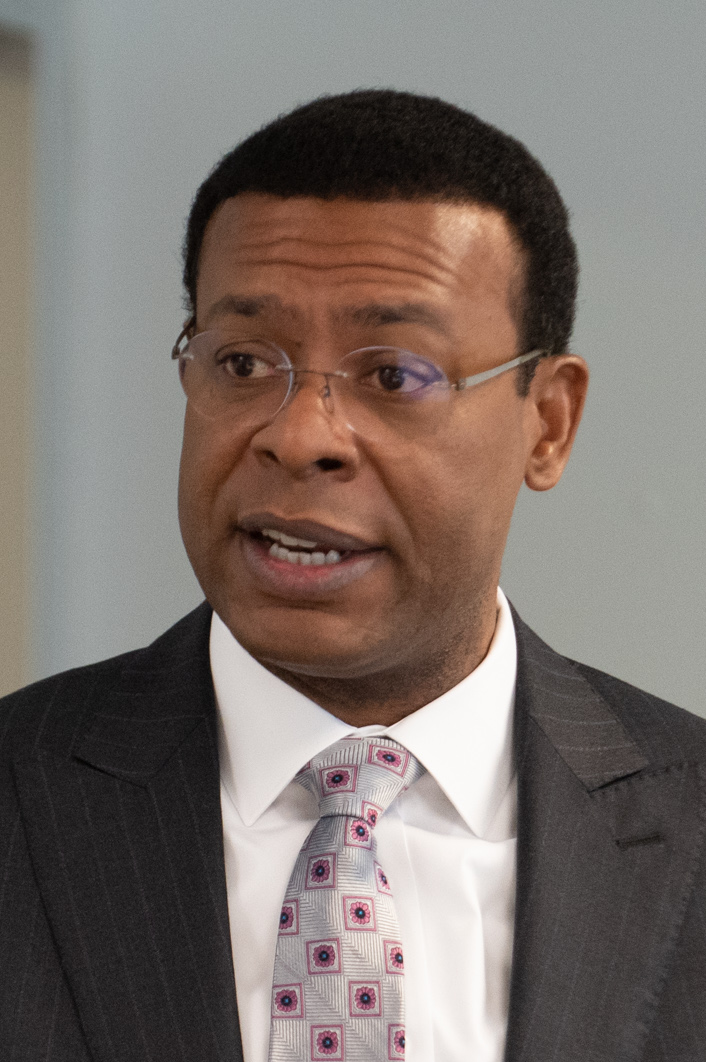
- Alexander in 2022

167th Mayor of Norfolk, Virginia
- Incumbent
- Assumed office July 1, 2016
- Preceded by: Paul D. Fraim

Member of the Virginia Senate from the 5th district
- In office September 17, 2012 – June 30, 2016
- Preceded by: Yvonne B. Miller
- Succeeded by: Lionell Spruill

Member of the Virginia House of Delegates from the 89th district
- In office August 2002 – September 17, 2012
- Preceded by: Jerrauld Jones
- Succeeded by: Daun Hester

Personal details
- Born: Kenneth Cooper Alexander; October 17, 1966 (age 59) Norfolk, Virginia, U.S.
- Party: Democratic
- Spouse: Donna Burnley
- Children: Kenneth, II and David
- Education: John Tyler Community College, Old Dominion University, Norwich University, Antioch University
- Profession: Chancellor (education), Educator and Entrepreneur

Kenneth Cooper Alexander (born October 17, 1966) is an American politician serving as mayor of Norfolk, Virginia, since July 2016.

Alexander also serves as chancellor for twenty career colleges which includes: (i) Centura College; a healthcare, business, and skilled trade programs school with four campuses in Hampton Roads and one in Richmond, Virginia; (ii) Aviation Institute of Maintenance (AIM), founded in Norfolk and now operating fourteen campuses nationwide and growing to become the largest system of aviation maintenance schools in the country; (iii) Tidewater Tech, a trade school located in Norfolk which offers welding and automotive mechanics programs and is currently the largest supplier of certified welders and HVAC technicians in the Commonwealth. The growth and work of this trade schools college system led to the establishment of the only Wind Turbine Technician program in the Mid-Atlantic, currently being offered at the Centura Norfolk Campus.

Alexander also serves as president of Metropolitan Funeral Services.

A native of Norfolk, he served in the Virginia House of Delegates from 2002 to 2012, representing the 89th District in Norfolk. He served in the Senate of Virginia from 2012 to 2016, representing the 5th District in Norfolk and Chesapeake.

Alexander has been a guest columnist in Virginia newspapers, lecturer on political science and leadership studies, and he is the author of Persistence: Evelyn Butts and the African American Quest for Full Citizenship and Self-Determination (2021).

== Early life and education ==
Born in 1966, Alexander grew up in the neighborhoods of Berkley and South Norfolk, at the crossroads of the cities of Norfolk and Chesapeake. He attended Lake Taylor High School where he was drum major of the marching band and served as parliamentarian of the student body, graduating in 1985.

Alexander next earned an associate degree in Mortuary Science from Brightpoint Community College, formerly John Tyler Community College, and a bachelor's degree in Political Science from Old Dominion University. He completed a master's degree in Diplomacy from Norwich University. In 2019, Alexander earned a PhD in Leadership and Change from Antioch University.

== Career ==
Alexander was a political science instructor at Tidewater Community College. In May 2002, Governor Mark Warner appointed the 89th District incumbent, Jerrauld Jones, to be director of the Virginia Department of Juvenile Justice. Alexander won the Democratic nomination, and won the special election on August 6 with 72% of the vote in a three-way race.

Alexander was unopposed in two of his three succeeding elections.On December 15, 2008, Alexander was chosen as chair of the Virginia Legislative Black Caucus. In a special election on September 4, 2012, Alexander was elected to the Virginia Senate representing the 5th Senate District; he succeeded Senator Yvonne Miller, who died in office.

On May 3, 2016, he was elected mayor of Norfolk, Virginia with 51.6% of the vote in a three-way race. He is the city's first black mayor. He would be re-elected in 2020 and again 2024.

He has served as President of the Beacon Light Civic League, vice-chair of Norfolk's Planning Commission, and member of Norfolk's Human Service Commission and Economic Development Authority. He helped found the Norfolk Chesapeake Portsmouth Community Development Federal Credit Union, a financial institution that provides access to low-cost financial services. Alexander was instrumental in developing new single-family homes in Berkley and a shopping center that attracted a major supermarket chain.

During Alexander's tenure as mayor, Norfolk's contract with Flock Safety has drawn public criticism from residents and privacy advocates.

== Electoral history ==
Date	Election	Candidate	Party	Votes	%
Virginia House of Delegates, 89th district
August 6, 2002	Special	K C Alexander	Democratic	3,927	72.57
August 6, 2002	Special	L Horsey	Republican	1,122	20.74
August 6, 2002	Special	S W Battle		348	6.43
August 6, 2002	Special	Write Ins		14	0.26
August 6, 2002	Special	Jerrauld Jones resigned; seat remained Democratic			
November 4, 2003	General	K C Alexander	Democratic	5,436	97.75
November 4, 2003	General	Write Ins		125	2.25
November 8, 2005	General	K C Alexander	Democratic	11.069	76.67
November 8, 2005	General	J G Behr	Republican	3,350	23.20
November 8, 2005	General	Write Ins		18	0.12
November 6, 2007	General	Kenneth Cooper Alexander	Democratic	5,265	96.62
November 6, 2007	General	Write Ins		184	3.37
November 3, 2009	General	Kenneth Cooper Alexander	Democratic	10,659	81.02
November 3, 2009	General	Anthony J. "Trip" Triplin		2,448	18.60
November 3, 2009	General	Write Ins		49	0.37
November 8, 2011	General	Kenneth Cooper Alexander	Democratic	5,821	96.82
November 8, 2011	General	Write Ins		191	3.17
Senate of Virginia, 5th district
September 4, 2012	Special	Kenneth Cooper Alexander	Democratic	3,643	98.51
September 4, 2012	Special	Write Ins		55	1.48
September 4, 2012	Special	Yvonne B. Miller died; seat remained Democratic			
Norfolk Mayor
May 3, 2016	General	Kenneth Cooper Alexander		16,397	51.68
May 3, 2016	General	Robert J. McCabe		7,276	22.93
May 3, 2016	General	Andy A. Protogyrou		8,022	25.29

== See also ==
- List of first African-American mayors

== Sources ==
- Virginia House of Delegates: Bio for Kenneth C. Alexander (2008 session)
