= Lionell Spruill =

American politician from Virginia

Lionell Spruill Sr.

Member of the Virginia Senate from the 5th district
- In office November 23, 2016 – January 10, 2024
- Preceded by: Kenny Alexander
- Succeeded by: Louise Lucas (Redistricting)

Member of the Virginia House of Delegates from the 77th district
- In office January 12, 1994 – November 23, 2016
- Preceded by: Tom Forehand
- Succeeded by: Cliff Hayes

Personal details
- Born: December 28, 1946 (age 79) South Norfolk, Virginia, U.S.
- Party: Democratic
- Children: Lionell Jr., Tony, Clayton, Nadia
- Education: Pacific Western University; Norfolk State University
- Occupation: Telephone technician (retired)
- Committees: Commerce and Labor; Local Government; Privileges and Elections; Rehabilitation and Social Services; Transportation

Lionell Spruill Sr. (born December 28, 1946, in South Norfolk, now Chesapeake, Virginia) is an American politician. A Democrat, Spruill represented the 5th district of the Virginia Senate from 2016 to 2024. In June 2023, he failed to win the Democratic primary to retain his seat, after redistricting which placed him in the same district as veteran state senator, Louise Lucas. Between 1994 and 2016, he was a member of the Virginia House of Delegates for the 77th district, made up of parts of the cities of Chesapeake and Suffolk.

== Notes ==
Virginia House of Delegates
Preceded by Tom Forehand	Member of the Virginia House of Delegates from the 77th district 1994–2016	Succeeded by Cliff Hayes
Senate of Virginia
Preceded by Kenny Alexander	Member of the Virginia Senate from the 5th district 2016–2024	Succeeded by Travis Hackworth
