= Cliff Hayes Jr. =

American politician

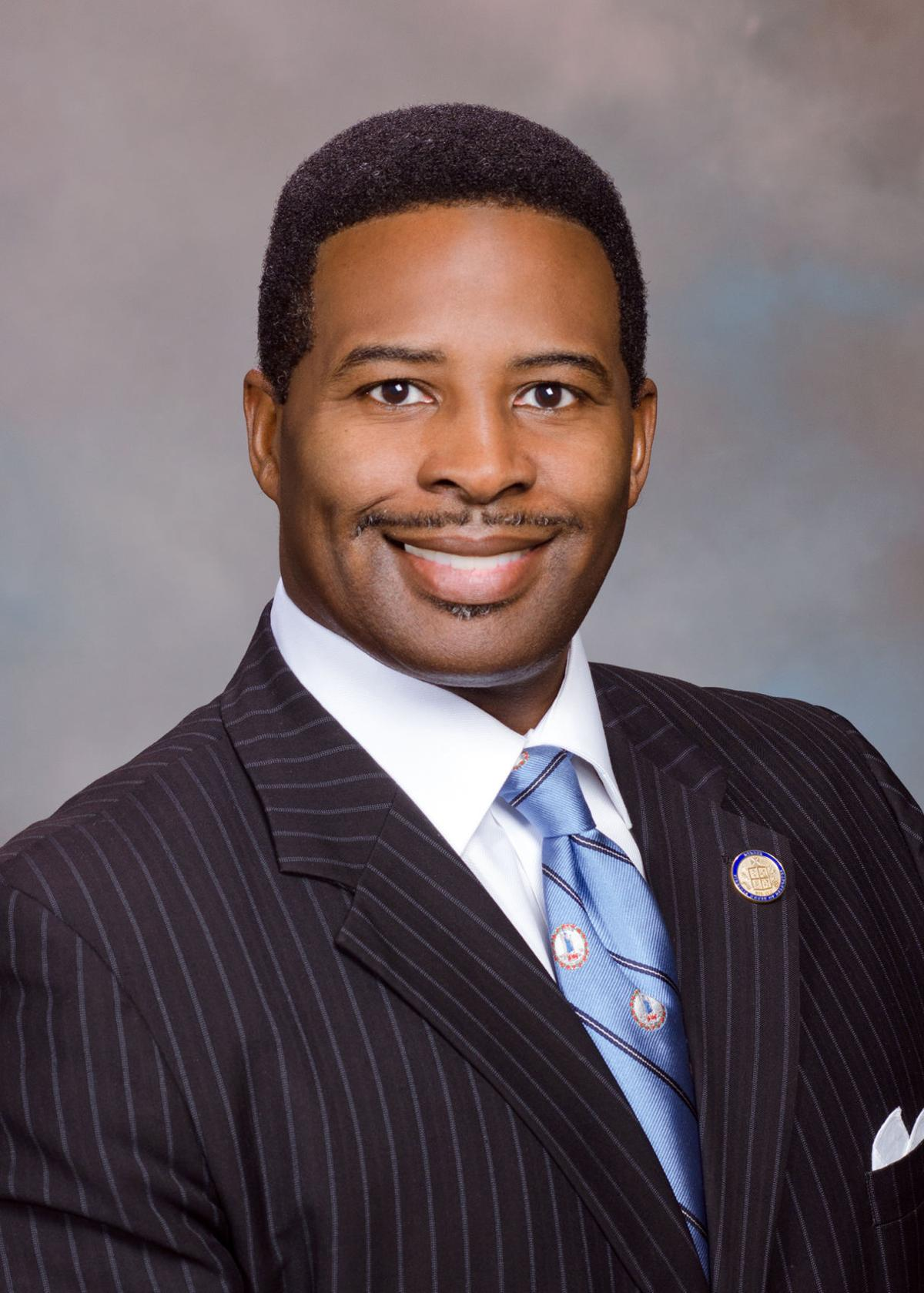

Member of the Virginia House of Delegates
- Incumbent
- Assumed office January 10, 2017
- Preceded by: Lionell Spruill
- Constituency: 77th district (2017–2024); 91st district (2024–present)

Personal details
- Born: Clifton Eugene Hayes Jr. October 11, 1967 (age 58) Chesapeake, Virginia, U.S.
- Party: Democratic
- Spouse: Kecia Brothers
- Education: Norfolk State University (BS)

Clifton Eugene "Cliff" Hayes Jr. (born October 11, 1967) is a member of the Virginia House of Delegates from the 91st district. He served on the Chesapeake City Council from 2004 to 2012 and was elected to represent Virginia's 77th House of Delegates district in November 2016. He has worked for Norfolk Public Schools and the Chesapeake Sheriff's Office in Information Technology.

Hayes currently serves as the chair of the Communications, Technology and Innovation Committee and as the chair of the Appropriations - Capital Outlay Subcommittee.
