= Mildred Henry =

American politician

Member of the Washington House of Representatives from the 17th district
- In office 1959–1965

Member of the Washington House of Representatives from the 16th district
- In office 1957–1959

Personal details
- Born: November 10, 1904 Klickitat, Washington
- Died: May 20, 1988 (aged 83) Seattle, Washington
- Party: Democratic
- Spouse: Al B. Henry

Mildred E. Henry (November 10, 1904 – May 20, 1988) was an American politician. She was a Democrat member of the Washington House of Representatives which included parts of Skamania County, Klickitat County and part of Clark County, from 1957 to 1965. Henry was later an official at Seattle City Council. In July 1971, Henry became the director of the Women's Division at the Office of Human Resources.
