= Edward F. Riley =

American politician

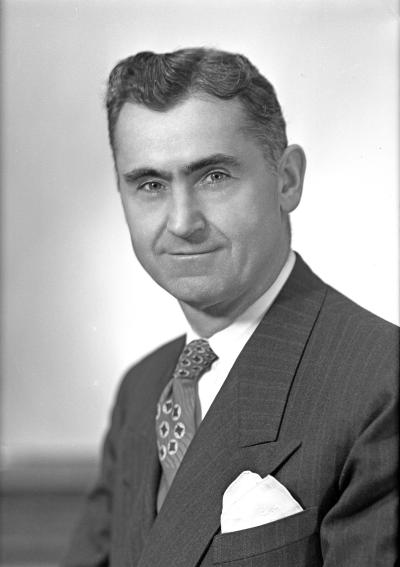
- Riley in 1951

President pro tempore of the Washington Senate
- In office January 14, 1963 – January 11, 1965
- Preceded by: Al B. Henry
- Succeeded by: William A. Gissberg
- In office January 14, 1957 – January 12, 1959
- Preceded by: Victor Zednick
- Succeeded by: Gerald G. Dixon

Member of the Washington Senate from the 35th district
- In office January 8, 1951 – August 10, 1965
- Preceded by: Charles J. McDonald
- Succeeded by: James E. Kennett

Member of the Washington House of Representatives from the 35th district
- In office January 9, 1939 – January 8, 1951
- Preceded by: Joseph D. Roberts
- Succeeded by: Ray L. Olsen

Personal details
- Born: November 25, 1895 Seattle, Washington, U.S.
- Died: February 16, 1990 (aged 94) Washington, U.S.
- Party: Democratic

Edward F. Riley Sr. (November 25, 1895 – February 16, 1990) was an American politician in the state of Washington. He served in the Washington House of Representatives from 1939 to 1951 and in the Senate from 1951 to 1965.

Washington State Senate
Preceded by Al B. Henry	President pro tempore of the Washington Senate; 1963–1965	Succeeded by William A. Gissberg
