= Ray L. Olsen =

American politician

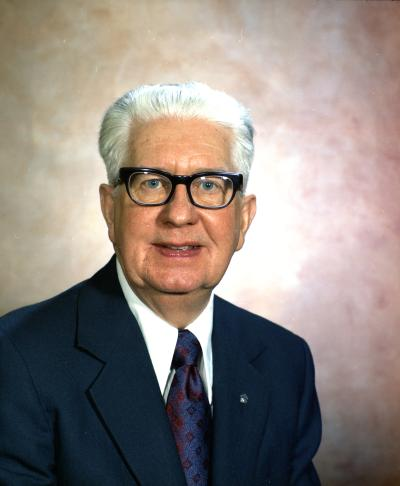
- Olsen in 1973

Member of the Washington House of Representatives from the 35th district
- In office January 8, 1951 – January 9, 1967
- Preceded by: Edward F. Riley
- Succeeded by: John Merrill

Personal details
- Born: September 4, 1904 Baker, Oregon, U.S.
- Died: February 14, 1992 (aged 87) Washington, U.S.
- Party: Democratic

Ray L. Olsen (September 4, 1904 – February 14, 1992) was an American politician in the state of Washington. He served in the Washington House of Representatives from 1951 to 1967 for the 35th district. He was a member of the World's Fair Commission and sponsored two bills to establish the Century 21 Exposition in Seattle, Washington, in 1962.

== Early career ==
Olsen was born in 1904 in Baker, Oregon. He attended business college and moved to Seattle, Washington, in 1940. He owned a men's clothing store in Bremerton, which he operated for fifteen years before getting involved in politics. He was the assistant district supervisor in the 1940 and 1950 census, as well as working as assistant director of the community chest and the Washington State Department of Transportation. Olsen was the public relations director for the state Restaurant Association between 1950 and 1959 and edited its monthly trade magazine, Allied Food & Beverage. He was married to his wife, Ellen.

== Political career ==
Olsen successfully ran for the Washington House of Representatives in the 1950 general election as a Democrat. He was elected to represent the 35th district. He was appointed to the World's Fair Commission in 1955 by House Speaker, John L. O'Brien, as one of two state representatives. The commission was tasked with researching whether the state should hold a 50th anniversary celebration for the Alaska–Yukon–Pacific Exposition of 1909. The commission ultimately recommended proceeding with the exposition and Olsen, O'Brien and Edward Carlson were tasked with convincing the newly-elected Governor Albert Rosellini to support the fair in his inaugural address. Rosellini agreed to mention it, but refused to announce a financial commitment.

Olsen introduced two bills in relation to the Century 21 Exposition during the 1957 legislative session. The first was a $7.5 million bond, which was guaranteed by an increase in state corporation taxes, which was the state's portions of the costs. The second bill expanded the World's Fair Commission from seven to fifteen members. During the six month run of the fair in 1962, Olsen escorted the U.S. ambassador to the United Nations, Adlai Stevenson, around the fair and represented Washington state at the Plaza of the States ceremonies. He was on the World Fair Commission until it was dissolved in 1963, when he was named as the state representative to the 1964 New York World's Fair.

He served as the budget director for the 2nd district of the King County Council between 1959 and 1969. He left the legislature in 1967 before serving two years as a legislative aide for the King County Council and then served two years as the sergeant-at-arms for the state House of Representative. He was a member of the State Advisory Council on Alcoholism.

== Death and legacy ==
Olsen died on February 14, 1992, at the age of 87. His papers are held by the University of Washington.
