= Ted F. Schroeder =

American politician

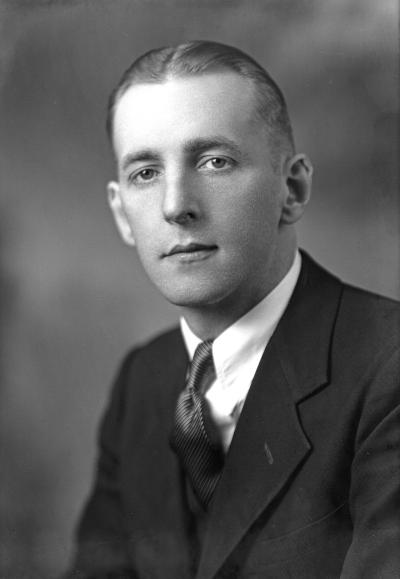
- Schroeder in 1935

President pro tempore of the Washington Senate
- In office January 8, 1951 – January 12, 1953
- Preceded by: Lester T. Parker
- Succeeded by: Victor Zednick

Member of the Washington Senate from the 25th district
- In office January 9, 1939 – January 12, 1953
- Preceded by: Hugh Herren
- Succeeded by: Reuben Knoblauch

Member of the Washington House of Representatives from the 25th district
- In office January 14, 1935 – January 11, 1937
- Preceded by: Tony Roesli
- Succeeded by: Kenneth Simmons

Personal details
- Born: Theodore Frederick Schroeder; September 3, 1902 Washington, U.S.
- Died: April 30, 1979 (aged 76) Washington, U.S.
- Party: Democratic

Theodore Frederick Schroeder (September 3, 1902 – April 30, 1979) was an American politician in the state of Washington. He served in the Washington State Senate and Washington House of Representatives. From 1951 to 1953, he was President pro tempore of the Senate.

Washington State Senate
Preceded by Lester T. Parker	President pro tempore of the Washington Senate; 1951–1953	Succeeded by Victor Zednick
