= Reuben Knoblauch =

American politician (1914–1992)

Reuben A. Knoblauch
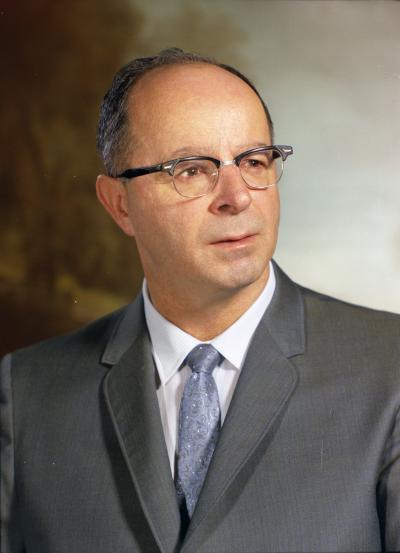
- Knoblauch in 1967

Member of the Washington Senate from the 25th district
- In office January 12, 1953 – January 10, 1977
- Preceded by: Ted F. Schroeder
- Succeeded by: Marcus Gaspard

Member of the Washington House of Representatives from the 25th district
- In office January 13, 1947 – January 12, 1953
- Preceded by: Frank Chervenka
- Succeeded by: Elmer Hyppa

Personal details
- Born: December 22, 1914 Sumner, Washington, U.S.
- Died: November 13, 1992 (aged 77) Washington, U.S.
- Party: Democratic

Reuben A. Knoblauch (December 22, 1914 – November 13, 1992) was an American politician in the state of Washington. He served in the Washington House of Representatives from 1947 to 1953 and in the Senate from 1953 to 1977.
