= Jay Jones =

American politician and attorney (born 1989)

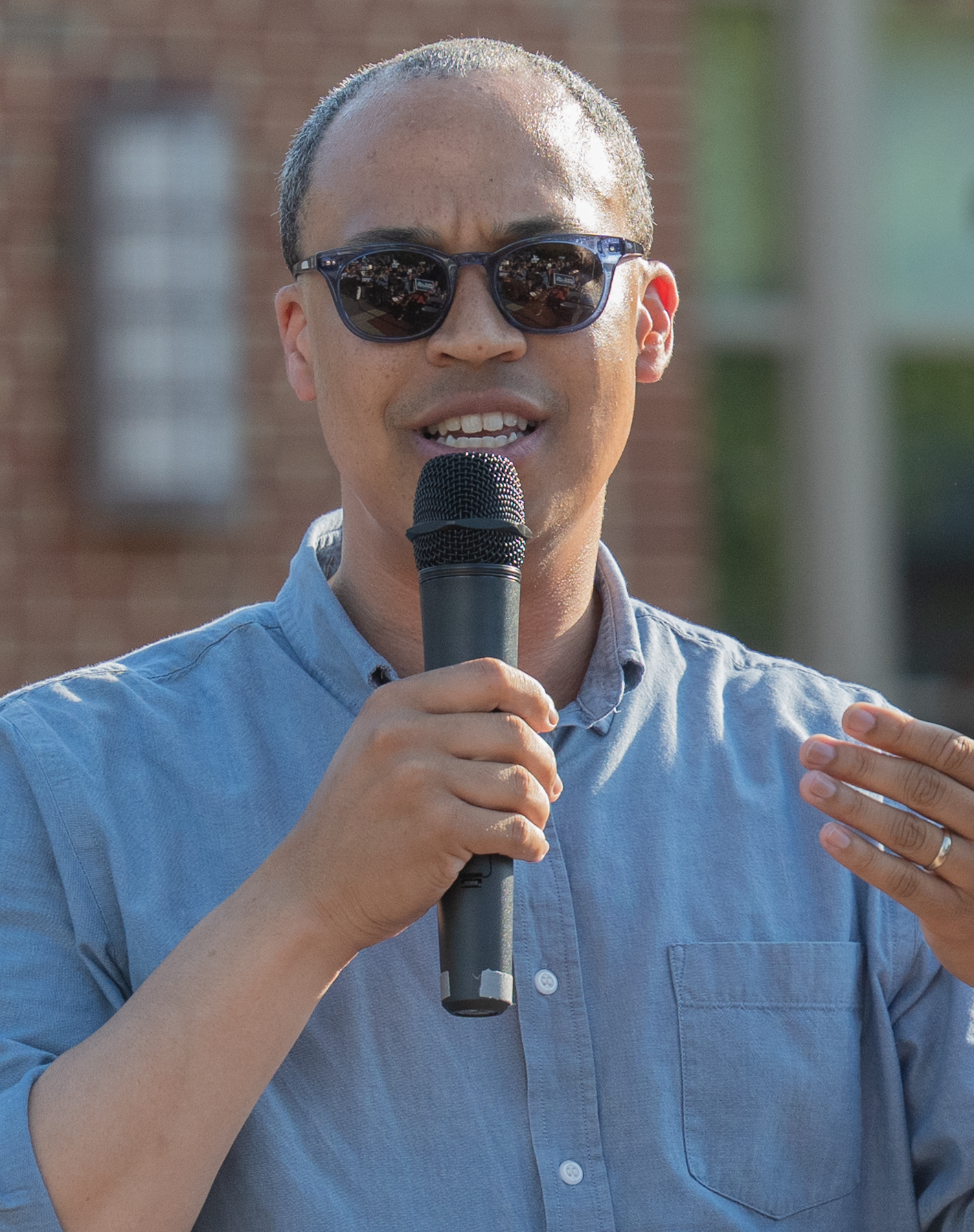
- Jones in 2025

49th Attorney General of Virginia
- Incumbent
- Assumed office January 17, 2026
- Governor: Abigail Spanberger
- Preceded by: Jason Miyares

Member of the Virginia House of Delegates from the 89th district
- In office January 10, 2018 – January 2, 2022
- Preceded by: Daun Hester
- Succeeded by: Jackie Glass

Personal details
- Born: Jerrauld Charles Corey Jones; March 14, 1989 (age 37) Norfolk, Virginia, U.S.
- Party: Democratic
- Spouse: Mavis Baah (m. 2020)
- Children: 2
- Parent: Jerrauld Jones (father)
- Education: College of William & Mary (BA); University of Virginia (JD)
- Website: Official website Campaign website

Jerrauld Charles Corey Jones (born March 14, 1989) is an American politician and attorney currently serving as the 49th attorney general of Virginia since 2026. A member of the Democratic Party, he previously served as a member of the Virginia House of Delegates for the 89th district from 2018 to 2022.

Born in Norfolk, Jones is the son of former Norfolk Circuit Court judge Jerrauld Jones. He graduated from the College of William & Mary and the University of Virginia School of Law. Jones was elected to the House of Delegates in 2017 and ran for Attorney General in 2021, losing the Democratic primary to incumbent Mark Herring, despite receiving an endorsement from governor Ralph Northam. Jones ran again for Attorney General in 2025, and he defeated Shannon Taylor in the Democratic primary and incumbent Republican Jason Miyares in the general election. Jones campaigned on opposition to President Donald Trump and the policies of Miyares. Jones is the first African American to serve as Virginia's attorney general.

During his campaign for attorney general, Jones received widespread condemnation after text messages from 2022 surfaced in which he "mused about violence" against the then-state house speaker Todd Gilbert and his children. Jones "fantasized" about Gilbert being shot and "wished" Gilbert's children would die, among other things. Jones later apologized to Gilbert's family, and won the Attorney General election regardless.

== Early life and education ==
Jones was born in Norfolk to family court judge Lyn M. Simmons and Jerrauld Jones (1954 – 2025), a former judge for Norfolk's circuit court who held the 89th district seat in the Virginia House of Delegates from 1988 to 2002. Simmons currently serves as the Chief Judge of the Norfolk Juvenile and Domestic Relations District Court. His paternal grandparents are Hilary H. Jones Jr. (an attorney and civil rights pioneer in Norfolk who was first Black member of both the Norfolk School Board and the Virginia state Board of Education) and Corinne D. Jones (a Norfolk school teacher who instrumental in the integration of at least one elementary school in Norfolk). His maternal grandparents are Charles and Margaret Simmons, who were tenured professors at Norfolk State University and Hampton University, respectively.

Like Jones' paternal grandfather, who served on the state Board of Education, his father Jerrauld would also hold a statewide office position in Virginia, having been appointed by Virginia Governor Mark Warner in 2002 to serve as Virginia's Director of the Department of Juvenile Justice. Jerrauld Jones would also serve the state as a Norfolk Circuit Court Judge. Jerrauld to this day remains one the few Virginians to have served in all three branches of Virginia state government.

Jones attended Norfolk Collegiate School and graduated in 2006. He then went on to attend the College of William & Mary as a William & Mary Scholar. He earned a Bachelor of Arts degree in government and history. During college, Jones served as a legislative intern for Paula Miller in 2009.

== Early career ==
After college, Jones spent two years in New York City as an associate with Goldman Sachs, where he focused on risk management and credit rating advisory, focusing on natural resources and technology companies. He then returned to Virginia and earned his Juris Doctor from the University of Virginia School of Law in 2015. While in law school, Jones interned in the office of state delegate Algie Howell.

=== Virginia House of Delegates ===
On February 13, 2017, Jones announced his candidacy for the 89th district of the Virginia House of Delegates, running for the same seat his father held from 1988 to 2002. The Democratic incumbent, Daun Hester, announced she would not run for reelection. He won the contested Democratic primary on June 13, 2017, and won the November 7, 2017 general election against Libertarian Terry Hurst.

He ran for reelection unopposed in the 2019 election cycle. Jones was appointed to the House Appropriations Committee at the beginning of his second term. In September 2019, Jones endorsed Cory Booker in the 2020 Democratic Party presidential primaries.

In January 2022, Jones resigned from the Virginia House of Delegates following the announcement that he and his wife were expecting their first child in summer 2022. Fellow Democrat Jackie Glass was elected to succeed him in a special election held on January 11, 2022.

=== Elections ===
==== 2021 ====
Jones was a candidate in the Democratic primary in the 2021 Virginia Attorney General election, where he faced incumbent Mark Herring. Jones criticized Herring over the incumbent's blackface controversy. Jones lost the June 8, 2021 primary to Herring.

==== 2025 ====
Jones ran for and won the Democratic nomination for the 2025 Virginia Attorney General election against Shannon Taylor. He defeated Republican incumbent Jason Miyares in the general election amidst a wave election for the Democrats.

=== Violent messages and subsequent fallout ===
In October 2025, Jones came under fire for an August 2022 text message conversation with his former Republican delegate colleague Carrie Coyner, in which Jones made "threatening messages" and used "graphic and violent language" against the then–state house speaker Todd Gilbert and his family. Jones, who was not in the legislature at the time, stated that if he had two bullets and could shoot Gilbert, Adolf Hitler, or Pol Pot, Gilbert "gets two bullets to the head". Jones acknowledged that he had talked about hoping Gilbert's children would die because "Only when people feel pain personally do they move on policy", before describing Gilbert and his wife as "evil" and "breeding little fascists".

The impetus for Jones's texts to Coyner was his anger at the eulogies Republican legislators had for former delegate Joseph P. Johnson, a moderate Democrat, who had recently died, with Jones disparaging "Johnson's political centrism". Jones said of Republican legislators who gave tributes about Johnson that "If those guys die before me I will go to their funerals to piss on their graves" and said that it will "Send them out awash in something".

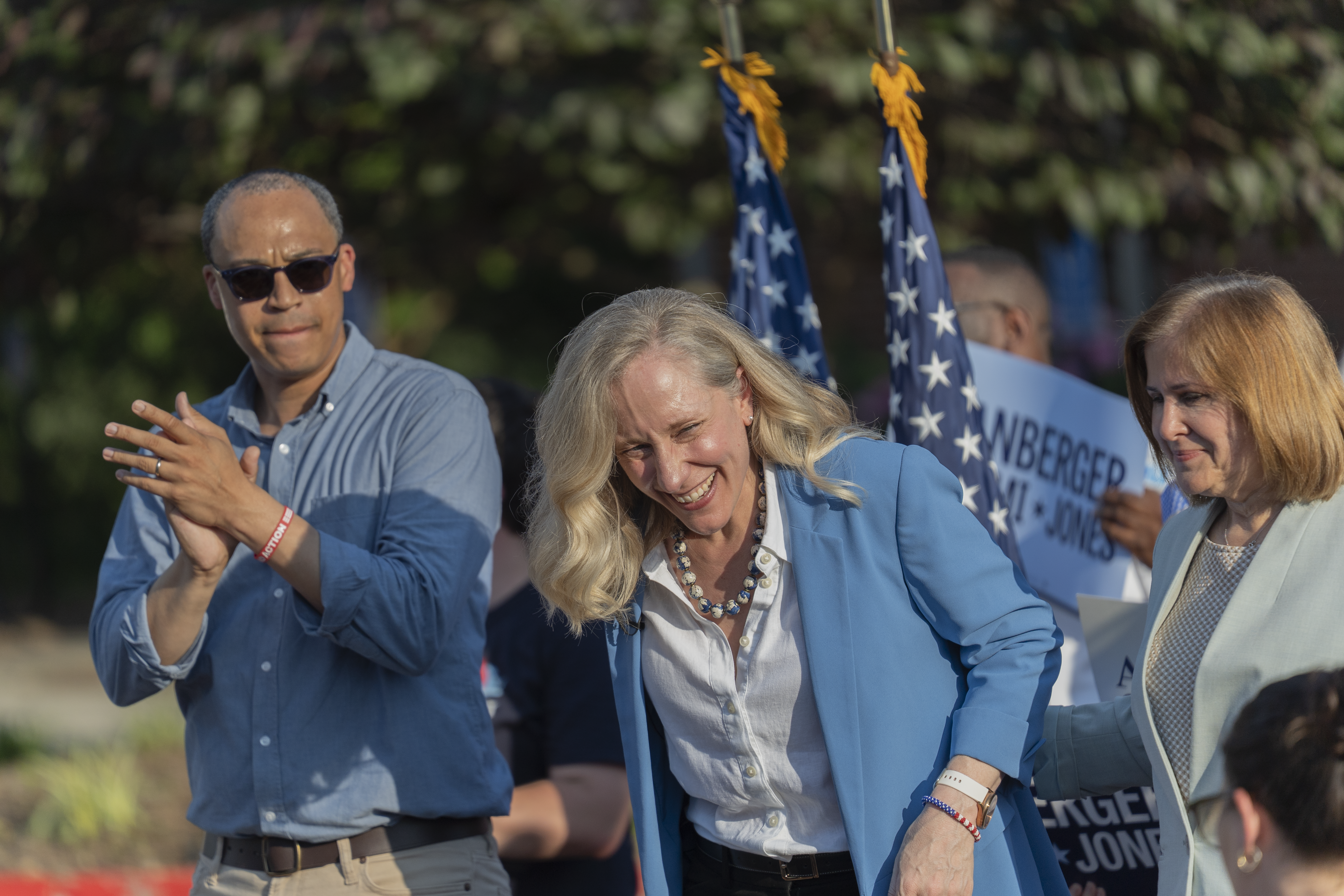
Jones at a rally with Abigail Spanberger and Ghazala Hashmi in Fairfax

The comments were made public by National Review in October 2025 during Jones's campaign for attorney general, and received bipartisan condemnation, including by fellow Democratic nominees former representative Abigail Spanberger and state senator Ghazala Hashmi, though they did not call on him to drop out of the race. Numerous prominent Republicans, including president Donald Trump, vice president JD Vance, governor Glenn Youngkin, and Republican gubernatorial nominee lieutenant governor Winsome Earle-Sears all requested for Jones to drop out of the election due to these messages. Jones acknowledged that he sent the texts and apologized to Gilbert and his family. Jason Miyares publicly stated that he "does not accept his apology", stating that Jones "had a chance then to apologize", and that he "is sorry only after it made the news".

After the story broke, Coyner said in an interview that Jones made charged comments during a phone conversation on qualified immunity in 2020. Jones allegedly said "if a few police officers died, then maybe they would stop killing people". Jones denied making the comment.

After the comments were publicly disclosed, polling conducted showed that the race was narrowing, with results indicating a statistical tie or his opponent leading, marking a shift from his earlier lead that received notable coverage in reporting on the campaign. Most undecided voters, however, ended up supporting Jones, with most undecided voters leaning towards Jones as shown in the final polls. Jones's strong performance with undecided voters is likely an example of social-desirability bias, also known as shy voter syndrome, where people are hesitant to reveal their voting preferences for candidates involved in scandals.

=== Reckless driving conviction and investigation ===
On January 21, 2022, a year after his first run for attorney general, a Virginia State Trooper clocked him speeding on Interstate 64 at 116 miles per hour – 46 over the speed limit – resulting in a reckless driving conviction in New Kent County. Of the 1,000 hours of community service he performed as part of his plea deal, 500 were for his own political action committee and the other 500 were for the NAACP Virginia State Conference. On October 22, 2025, a New Kent County Circuit Court judge approved a special prosecutor to investigate Jones's plea deal. On October 25, 2025, a new special prosecutor was appointed after the previous one recused himself.

== Attorney General of Virginia ==
Jones selected former Democratic governor Ralph Northam to co-chair his transition effort. He also spoke with Democratic governor-elect Abigail Spanberger to help ease tensions between the two during his transition period, and they discussed public safety measures in the Commonwealth.

One of his first actions upon being attorney general-elect was to seek an extension to Virginia's universal background check gun laws after a Lynchburg Circuit Court ruled that it unconstitutionally discriminated against adults aged 18 to 20. Miyares had previously declined to appeal the decision.

=== Tenure ===
On January 17, 2026, Jones was sworn into office by his mother, and Norfolk Juvenile and Domestic Relations District Court Chief Judge, Lyn M. Simmons. Upon entering office, Jones launched a 30-day review of all existing litigation in Virginia. In January 2026, Jones withdrew from an agreement that Miyares made with the U.S. Department of Justice to invalidate the 2020 Virginia Dream Act, which provided in-state tuition to students who met high school attendance requirements regardless of immigration status. Jones announced the establishment of the Public Advocacy Division, with three subdivisions, Consumer Protection, Civil Rights, and Utilities Regulation & Insurance.

In February 2026, Jones re-joined a lawsuit against an Environmental Protection Agency rule change that rolled back parts of the Clean Air Act; Miyares had removed Virginia from the lawsuit in 2024. In March 2026, Jones joined a multi-state lawsuit aiming to block the Nexstar-Tegna merger. In April 2026, Jones joined a multi-state lawsuit against Executive Order 14399, arguing that it was an illegal attempt to alter voter eligibility and mail-in voting. In May 2026, Jones joined a multi-state lawsuit against a Department of Education rule that narrowed the federal definition of professional degree and implemented new caps on federal loans for graduate students. In July 2026, Jones announced the creation of the Regulated Products Enforcement Unit to oversee the administration and enforcement of intoxicants, including vapes, THC products, and kratom. In August 2026, Jones announced the creation of the Worker Protection Unit, a unit in the attorney general's office focused on cases of wage theft, employee misclassification, and worker abuse.

== Personal life ==
Jones is Catholic. He is a lifelong member of the Basilica of Saint Mary of the Immaculate Conception in Norfolk.

Jones was introduced by a friend to public relations media manager Mavis Baah in 2017. They married in September 2020. The couple has two sons. Baah is the daughter of Janna Baah from Almaty, Kazakhstan, and Anthony Baah from Accra, Ghana. The Baah family immigrated to the United States when Mavis was five years old.

== Electoral history ==
Date	Election	Candidate	Party	Votes	%
Virginia House of Delegates, 89th district
June 13, 2017	Primary	Jerrauld "Jay" Jones	Democratic	5,242	66.19
June 13, 2017	Primary	Joe W. Dillard	Democratic	2,678	33.81
June 13, 2017	Primary	Daun Sessoms Hester did not seek re-election			
November 7, 2017	General	Jerrauld "Jay" Jones	Democratic	16,541	84.49
November 7, 2017	General	Terry Hurst	Libertarian	2,944	15.04
November 7, 2017	General	Write Ins		97	0.47
November 5, 2019	General	Jerrauld "Jay" Jones	Democratic	14,398	96.18
November 5, 2019	General	Write Ins		571	3.82
November 2, 2021	General	Jerrauld "Jay" Jones	Democratic	17,450	79.85
November 2, 2021	General	Hahns Copeland	Republican	4,340	19.86
November 2, 2021	General	Write Ins		63	0.29

2021 Virginia Attorney General election Democratic primary results
Party	Candidate	Votes	%
Democratic	Mark Herring (incumbent)	274,736	56.63
Democratic	Jay Jones	210,365	43.37
Total votes		485,101	100.00

2025 Virginia Attorney General election Democratic primary
Party	Candidate	Votes	%
Democratic	Jay Jones	252,976	51.11
Democratic	Shannon Taylor	241,969	48.89
Total votes		494,945	100.00

2025 Virginia Attorney General election
Party	Candidate	Votes	%	±%
Democratic	Jay Jones	1,804,940	53.14%	+3.59%
Republican	Jason Miyares (incumbent)	1,577,843	46.45%	−3.91%
Write-in		13,716	0.40%	+0.31%
Total votes		3,396,499	100.00%	N/A
Democratic gain from Republican				

Party political offices
Preceded by Mark Herring	Democratic nominee for Attorney General of Virginia; 2025	Most recent
Legal offices
Preceded by Jason Miyares	Attorney General of Virginia; 2026–present	Incumbent
