= Dott, West Virginia =

Unincorporated community in West Virginia, United States

- Unincorporated community
- Nickname: Turkey Gap
- Location within the state of West Virginia Dott, West Virginia (the United States)
- Coordinates: 37°28′07″N 81°14′45″W
- Country: United States
- State: West Virginia
- County: Mercer
- Elevation: 2,431 ft (741 m)
- Time zone: UTC-5 (Eastern (EST))
  - Summer (DST): UTC-4 (EDT)
- ZIP codes: 24721
- Area codes: 304 & 681
- GNIS feature ID: 1557178

Dott is an unincorporated community and coal town in Mercer County, West Virginia, United States. Dott is 3.1 miles (5.0 km) northwest of Matoaka and 1 mile (1.6 km) north of Springton. Dott was commonly known by "Turkey Gap Consolidated Coal Company", which was part of Dott.

A variant name was Wenonah.
