= Mike McCormack (politician) =

American politician (1921–2020)

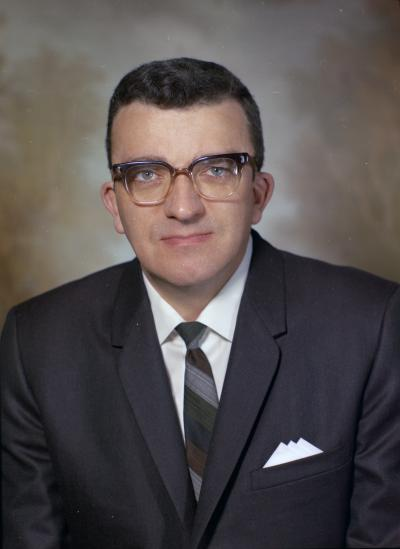
- McCormack in 1967

Member of the U.S. House of Representatives from Washington's 4th district
- In office January 3, 1971 – January 3, 1981
- Preceded by: Catherine May
- Succeeded by: Sid Morrison

Member of the Washington Senate from the 16th district
- In office January 9, 1961 – November 1, 1970
- Preceded by: Al B. Henry
- Succeeded by: Daniel J. Jolly

Member of the Washington House of Representatives from the 16th district
- In office January 14, 1957 – January 9, 1961
- Preceded by: Al B. Henry
- Succeeded by: James N. Leibold

Personal details
- Born: Claude Gilbert McCormack; December 14, 1921 Basil, Ohio, U.S.
- Died: November 7, 2020 (aged 98) Medford, Oregon, U.S.
- Party: Democratic
- Education: University of Toledo; Washington State College

Military service
- Allegiance: United States
- Branch/service: United States Army
- Years of service: 1943–1946
- Rank: First lieutenant
- Battles/wars: World War II

Claude Gilbert "Mike" McCormack (December 14, 1921 – November 7, 2020) was an American politician, who served as U.S. Representative from the State of Washington's Fourth Congressional District from 1971 to 1981. He was a Democrat.

== Biography ==
McCormack was born on December 14, 1921, at Basil, Ohio (now part of Baltimore, Ohio); his parents were of Scots-Irish and English descent. As a young man he attended schools in Toledo, Ohio, graduating from Waite High School. He began college at the University of Toledo in 1939, worked for two years, and then entered military service in 1943. He attended OCS and was commissioned as second lieutenant, parachute infantry, United States Army, with occupation duty in Germany until 1946, at which time he was discharged as first lieutenant. From 1946 to 1949, he attended Washington State College and received Bachelor and Master of Science degrees in Physical Chemistry. He worked briefly at the University of Puget Sound, and then spent twenty years as a research chemist with the atomic energy facilities of the Atomic Energy Commission at Hanford, during which time he resided in Richland, Washington.

In 1956, at age 35, McCormack was first elected to a public office as member of the Washington State House of Representatives, and was re-elected in 1958. During this period he sponsored successful legislation to allow automobiles by default to make right-turns at red lights, a novel idea at the time, in order to conserve energy by reducing time spent idling.

In 1960, at age 39, McCormack was elected to the State Senate, and was re-elected in 1964 and 1968. While serving in the State Senate, McCormack was a member of several important committees, including the Interim Budget Committee and the Joint Committee on Higher Education. He was often associated with public higher education in press coverage. He was a principal author of the legislation that combined and extended the junior colleges of the state into the Community College System during 1967 and 1968.

In 1970, at age 49, McCormack was elected to the United States House of Representatives. His election was an upset victory over five-term Republican Representative Catherine May.

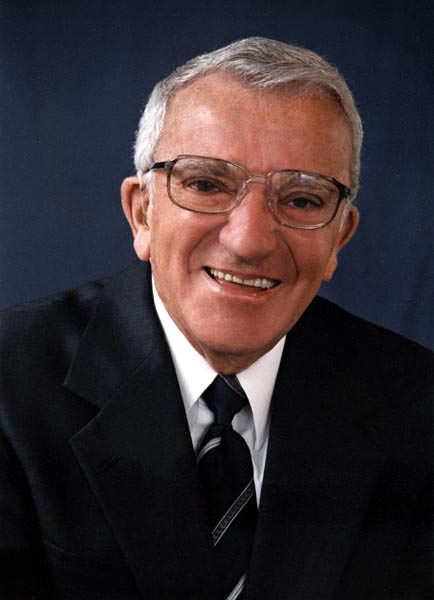
Mike McCormack

McCormack entered the United States Congress in 1971 as the only Member with a degree in science, emerging as an expert on energy matters, a prominent issue during the years of his congressional service. He was a member of the House Science and Technology Committee, and Chairman of the Subcommittee on Energy Research and Production. He was an author of laws that authorized efforts which included matters such as solar energy, electric cars and fusion power, and his expertise on overall energy issues was acknowledged by Members of Congress of both political parties.

McCormack was a cosponsor in a successful attempt to pass legislation intended to facilitate general conversion of the United States to the metric system of measurement. HR 8674, the Metric Conversion Act of 1975, was ultimately signed by President Ford into public law 94-168.

At times, McCormack took positions that were critical of the policies advocated by presidents and administrations of both political parties.

In 1980, at age 59, in the midst of the "Reagan landslide", McCormack unsuccessfully sought a sixth term against Sid Morrison.

In 1981, McCormack's Congressional papers were transferred to the Washington State University Library. He then worked in Washington, D.C., through the 1980s, during which time he was made a Fellow of the American Association for the Advancement of Science, and became a member of the Space Telescope Institute Council, an advisory group of the Space Telescope Science Institute. During the 1990s he lived in Ellensburg, Washington, where he created and ran the Institute for Science and Society, which was primarily involved in teaching science literacy to K-12 teachers.

In 1999, McCormack received the Charles Lathrop Parsons Award, the purpose of which is: "To recognize outstanding public service by a member of the American Chemical Society."

McCormack died in Medford, Oregon, in November 2020 at the age of 98.

== Elections ==
Date	Position	Status	Opponent	Result	Vote share	Opponent vote share
1954	WA Representative	Challenger	Lost in Democratic primary	Defeated	19.58%	
1956	WA Representative	Challenger	B.B. Smith (R)	Elected	59.49%	40.51%
1958	WA Representative	Incumbent	Eleanor Morbeck (R)	Re-elected	61.94%	38.06%
1960	WA Senator	Challenger	Robert W. Benoliel (R)	Elected	59.13%	40.87%
1964	WA Senator	Incumbent	Con Adams (R)	Re-elected	55.38%	44.62%
1968	WA Senator	Incumbent	Mary H. Aldrich (R)	Re-elected	69.69%	30.31%
1970	U.S. Representative	Challenger	Catherine May (R)	Elected	52.58%	47.42%
1972	U.S. Representative	Incumbent	Stewart Bledsoe (R)	Re-elected	52.08%	47.92%
1974	U.S. Representative	Incumbent	Floyd Paxton (R)	Re-elected	58.91%	41.09%
1976	U.S. Representative	Incumbent	Dick Granger (R)	Re-elected	57.78%	40.98%
1978	U.S. Representative	Incumbent	Susan Roylance (R)	Re-elected	61.15%	38.85%
1980	U.S. Representative	Incumbent	Sid Morrison (R)	Defeated	42.64%	57.36%

U.S. House of Representatives
Preceded by Catherine May	Member of the U.S. House of Representatives from Washington's 4th congressional district 1971–1981	Succeeded by Sid Morrison
