= Al B. Henry =

American politician

Al Henry
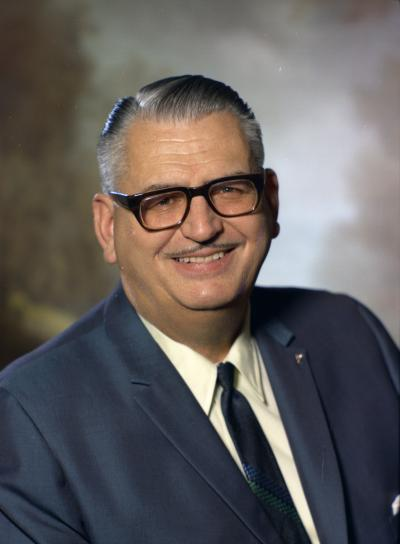
- Henry in 1969

President pro tempore of the Washington Senate
- In office January 9, 1967 – January 12, 1981
- Preceded by: William A. Gissberg
- Succeeded by: Barney Goltz
- In office January 9, 1961 – January 14, 1963
- Preceded by: Gerald G. Dixon
- Succeeded by: Edward F. Riley

Member of the Washington State Senate
- In office January 9, 1961 – January 12, 1981
- Preceded by: Frank W. Foley
- Succeeded by: Harold S. Zimmerman
- Constituency: 17th
- In office January 14, 1957 – January 9, 1961
- Preceded by: Stanton Ganders
- Succeeded by: Mike McCormack
- Constituency: 16th

Member of the Washington House of Representatives from the 16th district
- In office January 10, 1955 – January 14, 1957
- Preceded by: Kermit W. McKay
- Succeeded by: James N. Leibold
- In office January 8, 1951 – January 12, 1953
- Preceded by: C. C. Miller
- Succeeded by: Kermit W. McKay
- In office January 8, 1945 – January 13, 1947
- Preceded by: Lester E. Babcock
- Succeeded by: W. Y. Dent
- In office January 13, 1941 – January 11, 1943
- Preceded by: Mark M. Moulton
- Succeeded by: Lester E. Babcock

Personal details
- Born: April 12, 1911 Ness County, Kansas, U.S.
- Died: June 26, 1989 (aged 78) Oregon, U.S.
- Party: Democratic
- Spouse: Mildred Henry

Al B. Henry (April 12, 1911 – July 26, 1989) was an American politician in the state of Washington. He served in the Washington House of Representatives on and off from 1941 to 1957 and in the Senate from 1957 to 1981. He was also the President pro tempore of the Senate from 1961 to 1963 and again from 1967 to 1981.

Washington State Senate
Preceded by William A. Gissberg	President pro tempore of the Washington Senate; 1967–1981	Succeeded by Barney Goltz
