= J. Lewis Rawls Jr. =

American attorney and politician

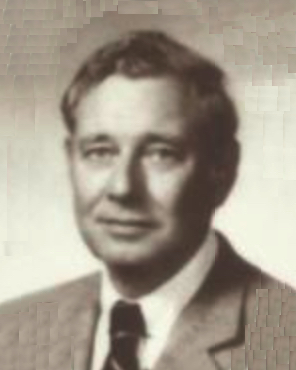
- Official portrait, 1976

Member of the Virginia Senate from the 15th district
- In office January 14, 1976 – January 9, 1980
- Preceded by: William V. Rawlings
- Succeeded by: Richard J. Holland

Member of the Virginia House of Delegates for Nansemond and Suffolk City
- In office January 10, 1962 – January 14, 1970
- Preceded by: Willis E. Cohoon
- Succeeded by: Sam Glasscock

Personal details
- Born: John Lewis Rawls Jr. December 7, 1923 Suffolk, Virginia, U.S.
- Died: April 25, 1994 (aged 70) Suffolk, Virginia, U.S.
- Party: Democratic
- Spouse: Mary Helen Macklin
- Education: University of Virginia (LLB)

Military service
- Branch/service: United States Navy
- Rank: Lieutenant (junior grade)
- Battles/wars: World War II

John Lewis Rawls Jr. (December 7, 1923 – April 25, 1994) was an American attorney and politician who served as a member of the Virginia Senate and House of Delegates.
