= Virginia's 5th Senate district =

American legislative district

Virginia's 5th State Senate district
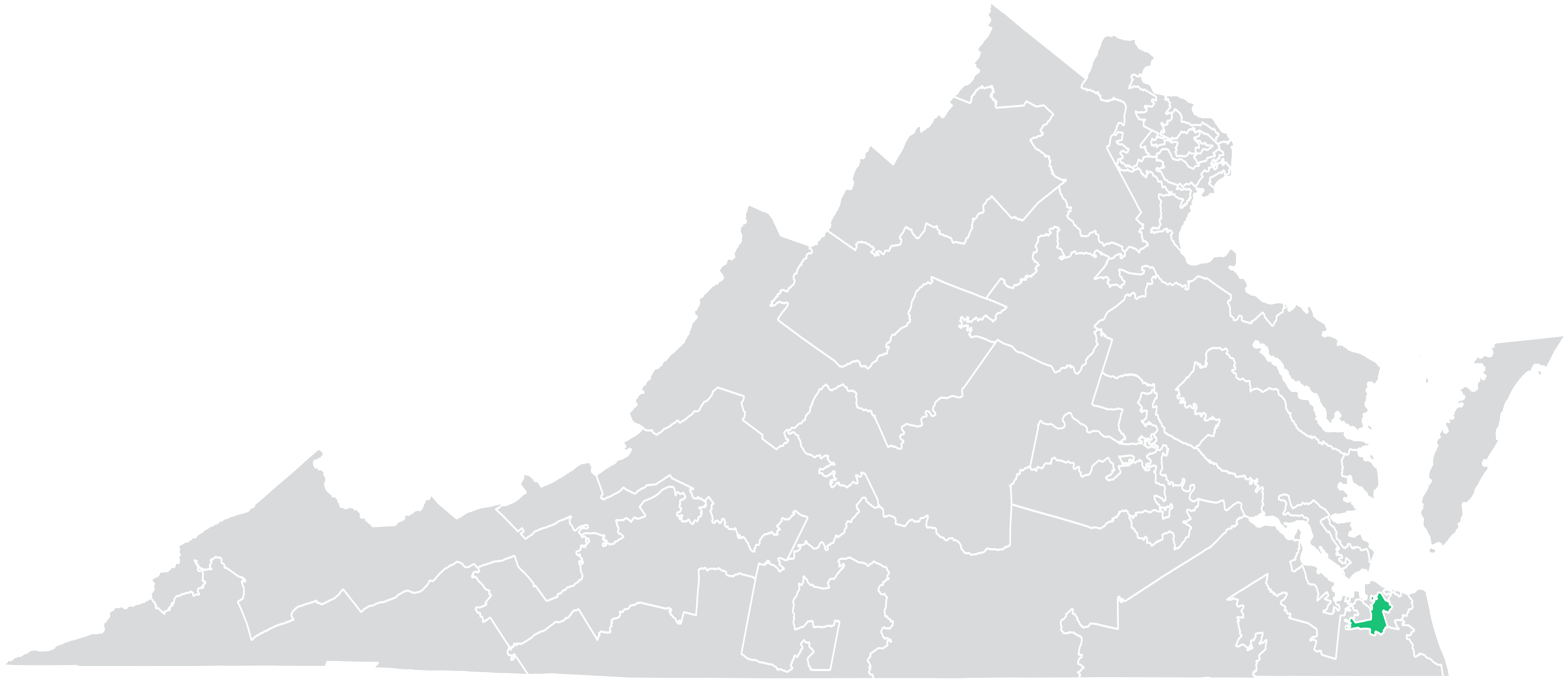
Senator
| Travis Hackworth; R–Tazewell |
- Demographics: 33% White; 53% Black; 7% Hispanic; 3% Asian; 4% Other
- Population (2019): 205,588
- Registered voters: 126,971

Virginia's 5th Senate district is one of 40 districts in the Senate of Virginia. It has been represented by Republican T. Travis Hackworth since 2024.

== Geography ==
District 5 is located in southwestern Virginia, including the counties of Bland, Giles, Pulaski, Smyth, Tazewell, and portions of Montgomery and Wythe. The independent city that is part of District 5 is Radford.

The district overlaps with Virginia's 9th congressional district, and with the 41st, 42nd, 43rd, and 46th districts of the Virginia House of Delegates.

== Recent election results ==
=== 2019 ===
2019 Virginia Senate election, District 5
| Party | Candidate | Votes | % |
|---|---|---|---|
| Democratic | Lionell Spruill (incumbent) | 31,576 | 79.2 |
| Independent | Jeff Staples | 7,812 | 19.6 |
| Total votes | | 39,845 | 100 |

=== 2016 special ===
2016 Virginia Senate special election, District 5
| Party | Candidate | Votes | % |
|---|---|---|---|
| Democratic | Lionell Spruill | 66,989 | 96.2 |
| Total votes | | 69,616 | 100 |
| Democratic hold | | | |

=== 2015 ===
2015 Virginia Senate election, District 5
| Party | Candidate | Votes | % |
|---|---|---|---|
| Democratic | Kenny Alexander (incumbent) | 13,955 | 95.4 |
| Total votes | | 14,623 | 100 |
| Democratic hold | | | |

=== 2012 special ===
2012 Virginia Senate special election, District 5
| Party | Candidate | Votes | % |
|---|---|---|---|
| Democratic | Kenny Alexander | 3,643 | 98.4 |
| Total votes | | 3,701 | 100 |
| Democratic hold | | | |

=== 2011 ===
2011 Virginia Senate election, District 5
| Party | Candidate | Votes | % |
|---|---|---|---|
| Democratic | Yvonne Miller (incumbent) | 11,090 | 95.6 |
| Total votes | | 11,606 | 100 |
| Democratic hold | | | |

=== Federal and statewide results ===
| Year | Office | Results |
|---|---|---|
| 2020 | President | Biden 73.1–25.1% |
| 2017 | Governor | Northam 75.7–23.2% |
| 2016 | President | Clinton 70.6–25.5% |
| 2014 | Senate | Warner 72.1–26.0% |
| 2013 | Governor | McAuliffe 72.6–23.4% |
| 2012 | President | Obama 74.8–24.3% |
| 2012 | Senate | Kaine 74.9–25.1% |

== Historical results ==
All election results below took place prior to 2011 redistricting, and thus were under different district lines.

=== 2007 ===
2007 Virginia Senate election, District 5
| Party | Candidate | Votes | % |
|---|---|---|---|
| Democratic | Yvonne Miller (incumbent) | 10,977 | 96.9 |
| Total votes | | 11,327 | 100 |
| Democratic hold | | | |

=== 2003 ===
2003 Virginia Senate election, District 5
| Party | Candidate | Votes | % |
|---|---|---|---|
| Democratic | Yvonne Miller (incumbent) | 12,622 | 97.9 |
| Total votes | | 12,899 | 100 |
| Democratic hold | | | |

=== 1999 ===
1999 Virginia Senate election, District 5
| Party | Candidate | Votes | % |
|---|---|---|---|
| Democratic | Yvonne Miller (incumbent) | 17,464 | 97.6 |
| Total votes | | 17,901 | 100 |
| Democratic hold | | | |

=== 1995 ===
1995 Virginia Senate election, District 5
| Party | Candidate | Votes | % |
|---|---|---|---|
| Democratic | Yvonne Miller (incumbent) | 18,658 | 76.7 |
| Republican | Bruce Wilcox | 5,673 | 23.3 |
| Total votes | | 24,336 | 100 |
| Democratic hold | | | |

== District officeholders since 1940 ==
| Years | Senator, District 5 | Counties/Cities in District |
|---|---|---|
| 1940–1941 | Edward Everett Holland (D) | Isle of Wight County, Nansemond County, Southampton County, and the City of Suffolk |
| 1941–1944 | A. E. S. Stephens (D) | Isle of Wight County, Nansemond County, Southampton County, and the City of Suffolk |
| 1944–1948 | A. E. S. Stephens (D) | Isle of Wight County, Nansemond County, Southampton County, and the City of Suffolk |
| 1948–1952 | A. E. S. Stephens (D) | Isle of Wight County, Nansemond County, Southampton County, and the City of Suffolk |
| 1952–1956 | Mills Godwin (D) | Isle of Wight County, Nansemond County, Southampton County, and the City of Suffolk |
| 1956–1960 | Mills Godwin (D) | Isle of Wight County, Nansemond County, Southampton County, and the City of Suffolk |
| 1960–1961 | Mills Godwin (D) | Isle of Wight County, Nansemond County, Southampton County, and the City of Suffolk |
| 1961–1964 | William V. Rawlings (D) | Isle of Wight County, Virginia, Nansemond County, Southampton County, the City of Franklin and the City of Suffolk |
| 1964–1968 | William V. Rawlings (D) | Isle of Wight County, Virginia, Nansemond County, Southampton County, the City of Franklin and the City of Suffolk |
| 1968–1972 | William V. Rawlings (D) | Isle of Wight County, Virginia, Nansemond County, Southampton County, the City of Franklin and the City of Suffolk |
| 1972–1976 | Stanley C. Walker (D); Peter K. Babalas (D); Thomas R. McNamara (D) | City of Norfolk, City of Virginia Beach (part) |
| 1976–1980 | Stanley C. Walker (D); Peter K. Babalas (D); Joseph T. Fitzpatrick (D) | City of Norfolk, City of Virginia Beach (part) |
| 1980–1982 | Stanley C. Walker (D); Peter K. Babalas (D); Joseph T. Fitzpatrick (D) | City of Norfolk, City of Virginia Beach (part) |
| 1982–1984 | Stanley C. Walker (D); Peter K. Babalas (D); Evelyn Momsen Hailey (D) | City of Norfolk, City of Virginia Beach (part) |
| 1984–1988 | Peter K. Babalas (D) | City of Norfolk (part) |
| 1988–1992 | Yvonne Miller (D) | City of Norfolk (part) |
| 1992–1996 | Yvonne Miller (D) | City of Chesapeake (part), City of Norfolk (part) |
| 1996–2000 | Yvonne Miller (D) | City of Chesapeake (part), City of Norfolk (part) |
| 2000–2004 | Yvonne Miller (D) | City of Chesapeake (part), City of Norfolk (part) |
| 2004–2008 | Yvonne Miller (D) | City of Chesapeake (part), City of Norfolk (part) |
| 2008–2012 | Yvonne Miller (D) | City of Chesapeake (part), City of Norfolk (part) |
| 2012–2016 | Kenny Alexander (D) | City of Chesapeake (part), City of Norfolk (part) |
| 2016–present | Lionell Spruill (D) | City of Chesapeake (part), City of Norfolk (part) |
