= William V. Rawlings =

American politician (1913–1975)

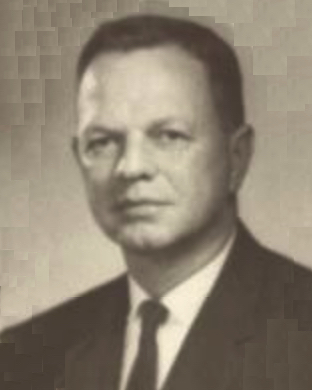

Member of the Virginia Senate
- In office January 10, 1962 – December 27, 1975
- Preceded by: Mills Godwin
- Succeeded by: J. Lewis Rawls Jr.
- Constituency: 5th district (1962‍–‍1972); 15th district (1972‍–‍1975)

Personal details
- Born: William Vincent Rawlings; August 17, 1913 Capron, Virginia, U.S.
- Died: December 27, 1975 (aged 62) Virginia, U.S.
- Party: Democratic
- Spouse: Novella Pope
- Education: Virginia Military Institute (BS); University of Virginia (LLB)

William Vincent Rawlings (August 17, 1913 – December 27, 1975) was an attorney and Democratic State Senator from Virginia, who served in the Senate of Virginia from 1961 until his death in 1975.

== Early life ==
Rawlings was born in Capron, Virginia, on August 17, 1913. He graduated from Virginia Military Institute in 1933 with a bachelor's degree in Civil Engineering. He received his law degree from the University of Virginia and practiced law in the town of Franklin, Virginia. Rawlings married Novella Pope.

== Public service ==
Rawlings served as an appointed member of the Southampton County School Board and chaired the board during the upheaval of public school desegregation and Virginia's policy of Massive resistance.

In 1961, Senator Mills Godwin was elected Lieutenant Governor of Virginia and Rawlings contested the special election to represent the 5th District, winning with about 60% of the vote. Rawlings served in the Senate until his death in 1975.

== Death ==
Rawlings died on December 27, 1975, and was buried in Capron, Virginia.
