= William T. Parker =

American politician (1928–2014)

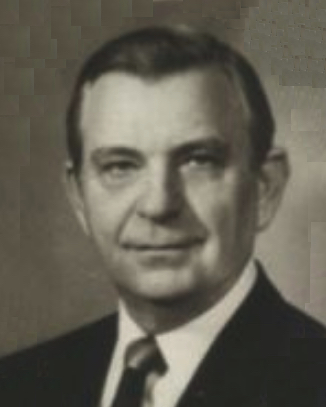
- Official portrait, 1984

Member of the Virginia Senate from the 14th district
- In office January 9, 1980 – January 13, 1988
- Preceded by: Russell I. Townsend Jr.
- Succeeded by: Mark Earley

Member of the Virginia House of Delegates from the 38th district
- In office January 14, 1976 – January 9, 1980
- Preceded by: Stanley G. Bryan
- Succeeded by: Tom Forehand

Personal details
- Born: William Thomas Parker; August 29, 1928 Norfolk, Virginia, U.S.
- Died: January 25, 2014 (aged 85) Chesapeake, Virginia, U.S.
- Party: Democratic
- Spouse: Vivian Old (m. 1955)

Military service
- Branch/service: United States Air Force

William Thomas Parker (August 29, 1928 – January 25, 2014) was an American politician who served in the Virginia House of Delegates and Virginia Senate. He was narrowly defeated for reelection in 1987 by lawyer Mark Earley.
