= Frank Brouillet =

11th Washington Superintendent of Public Instruction

Frank (Buster) Brouillet
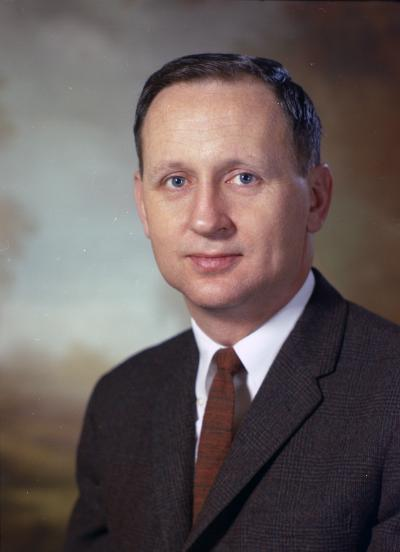
- Brouillet in 1967

11th Washington Superintendent of Public Instruction
- In office January 10, 1973 – January 11, 1989
- Governor: Dan Evans; Dixy Lee Ray; Booth Gardner; John Spellman
- Preceded by: Louis Bruno
- Succeeded by: Judith Billings

Member of the Washington House of Representatives from the 25th district
- In office January 14, 1957 – January 8, 1973
- Preceded by: Elmer Hyppa
- Succeeded by: Leonard A. Sawyer

Personal details
- Born: May 18, 1928 Puyallup, Washington, U.S.
- Died: January 20, 2001 (aged 72) Tacoma, Washington, U.S.
- Party: Democratic
- Spouse: Marge Sarsten
- Children: Marc Brouillet; Blair Brouillet

Frank B. (Buster) Brouillet (May 18, 1928 – January 20, 2001) was an American politician and educator in the state of Washington. He served in the Washington House of Representatives from 1957 to 1973. He also served as Washington's superintendent of public instruction. Brouillet Elementary School in Puyallup, WA, is named in his honor.

== Education ==
Brouillet attended the Washington State University on an athletic scholarship pertaining to football. However, after finding little enjoyment in college athletics, he transferred to the University of Puget Sound on an academic scholarship. He later transferred to the University of Montana where he earned B.A., B.Ed. and M.A. degrees
