= Mayoral elections in Norfolk, Virginia =

Mayoral elections in Norfolk, Virginia are held every four years to elect the mayor of Norfolk, Virginia. The Norfolk mayor has been elected by popular vote since 2006.

All Norfolk municipal elections are required to be non-partisan, but most candidates can be affiliated with political parties. The elections occur in line with presidential election years after shifting from midterm years in 2016.

== 2006 ==
Norfolk mayoral election, 2006
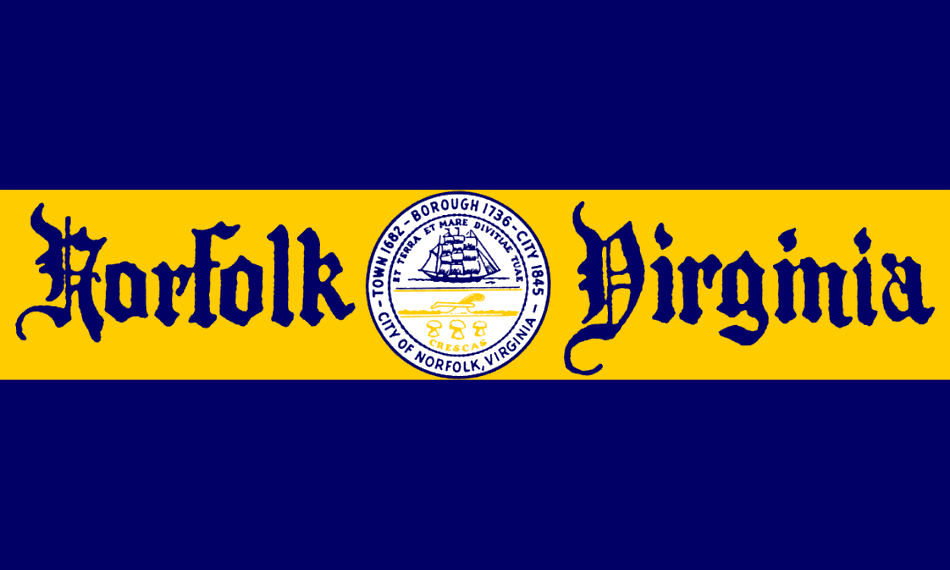
- May 2, 2006
- Turnout: 18.26%
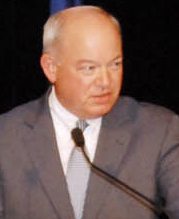

Nominee	Paul D. Fraim	Daniel E. Montague
Party	Nonpartisan	Nonpartisan
Popular vote	15,015	4,177
Percentage	77.8%	21.6%
Mayor before election
Paul D. Fraim
Republican
Elected mayor
Paul D. Fraim
Republican

The Norfolk mayoral election of 2006 took place on May 2, 2006. Voters elected the Mayor of Norfolk. This was the first popular election for mayor of Norfolk since 1916. It saw the reelection of incumbent mayor Paul D. Fraim.

=== Results ===
Norfolk mayoral election, 2006
Party	Candidate	Votes	%
Nonpartisan	Paul D. Fraim (incumbent)	15,015	77.8
Nonpartisan	Daniel E. Montague	4,177	21.6
Write-In	Write-ins	106	0.5
Total votes		19,298	

== 2010 ==
Norfolk mayoral election, 2010
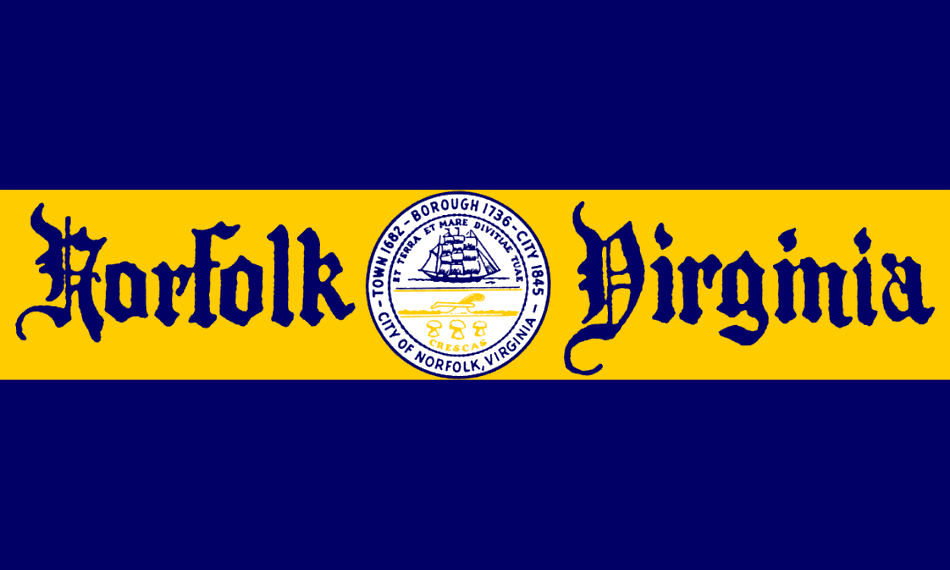
- May 4, 2010
- Turnout: 22.34% ▲4.08 pp
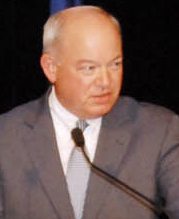

Nominee	Paul D. Fraim	Daun Sessoms Hester
Party	Nonpartisan	Nonpartisan
Popular vote	16,688	7,992
Percentage	63.5%	30.4%
Mayor before election
Paul D. Fraim
Republican
Elected mayor
Paul D. Fraim
Republican

The Norfolk mayoral election of 2010 took place on May 4, 2010. Voters elected the Mayor of Norfolk. It saw the reelection of incumbent mayor Paul D. Fraim.

=== Results ===
Norfolk mayoral election, 2010
Party	Candidate	Votes	%
Nonpartisan	Paul D. Fraim (incumbent)	16,688	63.5
Nonpartisan	Daun Sessoms Hester	7,992	30.4
Nonpartisan	Daniel E. Montague	804	3.1
Nonpartisan	Ryan Patrick Cooper	721	2.7
Write-In	Write-ins	56	0.2
Total votes		26,261	

== 2014 ==
Norfolk mayoral election, 2014
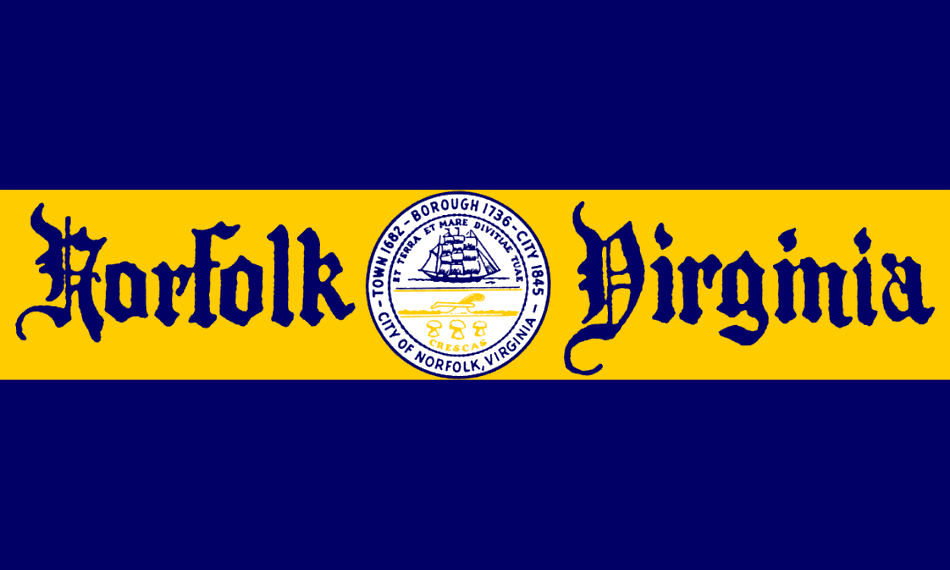
- May 6, 2014
- Turnout: 13.65% ▼8.69 pp
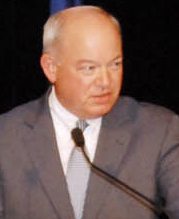

Nominee	Paul D. Fraim	Michael Jerrell Muhammad	Jane Eileen Bethel
Party	Nonpartisan	Nonpartisan	Nonpartisan
Popular vote	11,252	2,555	1,869
Percentage	71.0%	16.1%	11.8%
Mayor before election
Paul D. Fraim
Republican
Elected mayor
Paul D. Fraim
Republican

The Norfolk mayoral election of 2014 took place on May 7, 2014. Voters elected the Mayor of Norfolk. It saw the reelection of incumbent mayor Paul D. Fraim.

=== Results ===
Norfolk mayoral election, 2014
Party	Candidate	Votes	%
Nonpartisan	Paul D. Fraim (incumbent)	11,252	71.0
Nonpartisan	Michael Jerrell Muhammad	2,555	16.1
Nonpartisan	Jane Eileen Bethel	1,869	11.8
Write-in		161	1%
Total votes		15,837	

== 2016 ==
Norfolk mayoral election, 2016
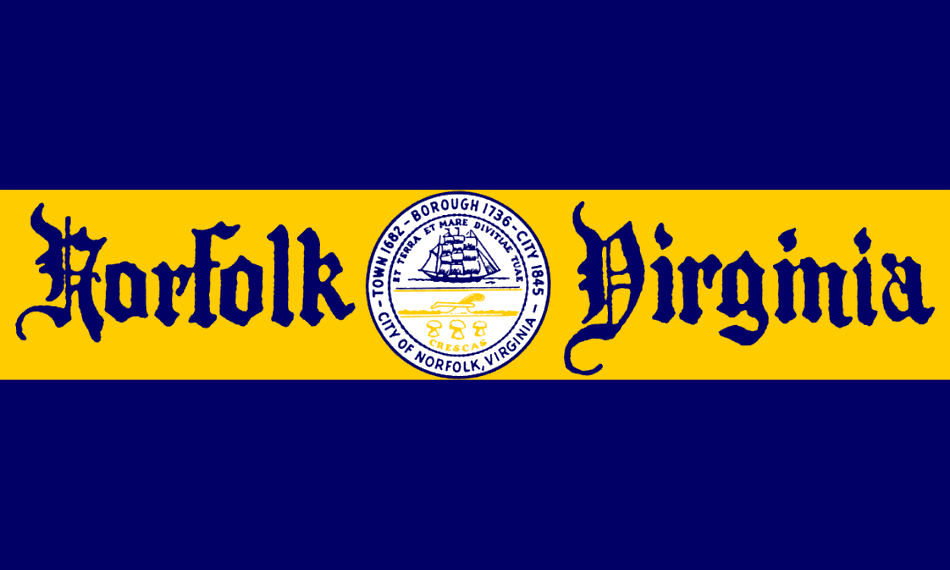
- May 3, 2016
- Turnout: 27.56% ▲13.91 pp
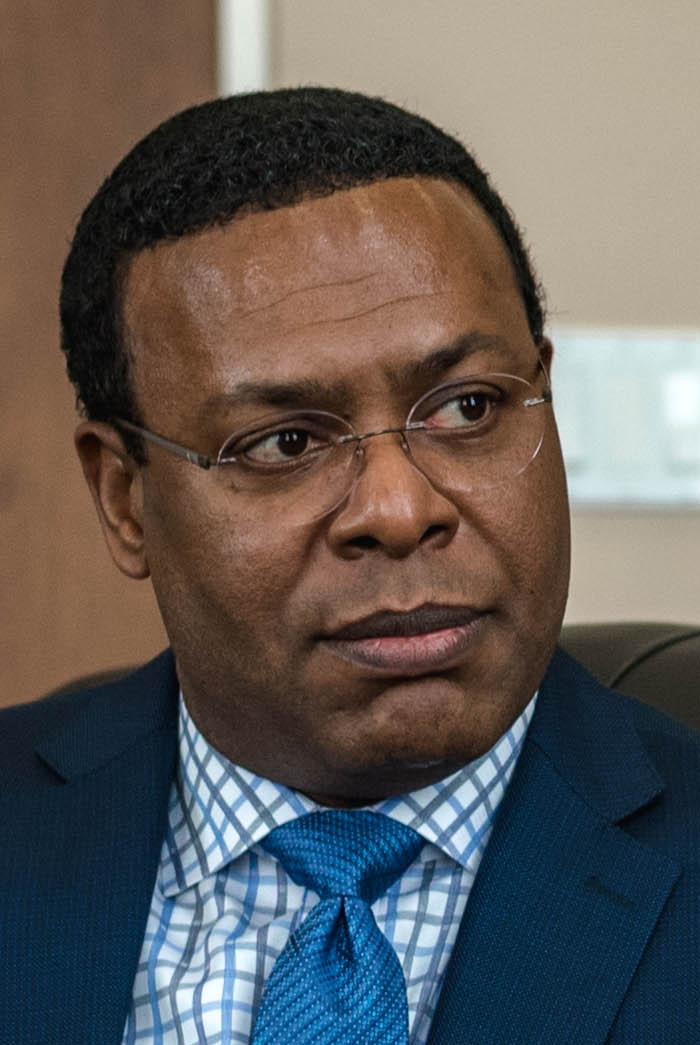

Nominee	Kenny Alexander	Andy A. Protogyrou	Robert James McCabe
Party	Nonpartisan	Nonpartisan	Nonpartisan
Popular vote	16,397	8,022	7,276
Percentage	51.7%	25.3%	22.9%
- 2016 Norfolk Mayoral Election with results colored by precinct. Green for Kenny Alexander, orange for Andy A. Protogyrou, and purple for Robert James McCabe.
Mayor before election
Paul D. Fraim
Democratic
Elected mayor
Kenny Alexander
Democratic

The Norfolk mayoral election of 2016 took place on May 3, 2016. Voters elected the Mayor of Norfolk. It saw the election of Kenny Alexander.

Alexander became the first African American mayor of Norfolk.

=== Results ===
Norfolk mayoral election, 2016
Party	Candidate	Votes	%
Nonpartisan	Kenny Alexander	16,397	51.7
Nonpartisan	Andy A. Protogyrou	8,022	25.3
Nonpartisan	Robert James McCabe	7,276	22.9
	Write-in	30	0.1
Total votes		31,725	

== 2020 ==
Norfolk mayoral election, 2020
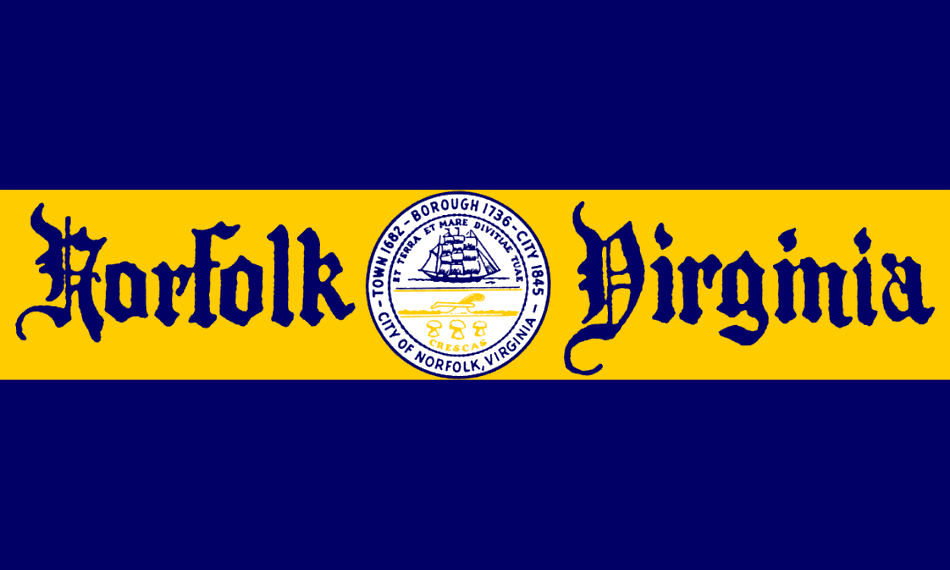
- May 19, 2020
- Turnout: 9.63% ▼17.93 pp
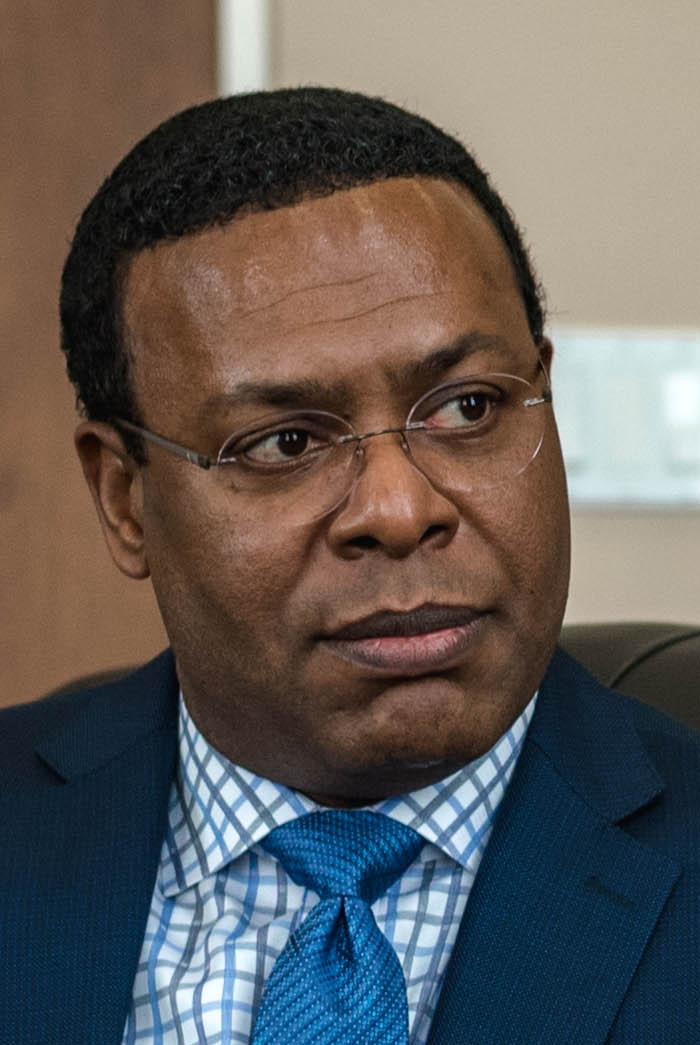

Nominee	Kenny Alexander	Write-in
Party	Nonpartisan
Popular vote	12,252	560
Percentage	95.6%	4.4%
Mayor before election
Kenny Alexander
Democratic
Elected mayor
Kenny Alexander
Democratic

The Norfolk mayoral election of 2020 took place on May 19, 2020. Voters elected the Mayor of Norfolk, Virginia, United States. It saw the election of incumbent mayor Kenny Alexander, who ran unopposed.

Alexander became the first African American mayor of Norfolk to be re-elected following his initial election in 2016, 4 years earlier.

=== Results ===
Norfolk mayoral election, 2020
Party	Candidate	Votes	%
Nonpartisan	Kenny Alexander	12,252	95.6
	Write-in	560	4.4
Total votes		12,812	

== See also ==
- Elections in Virginia
- Political party strength in Virginia
- Government of Virginia
- Timeline of Norfolk, Virginia
