= Yvonne B. Miller =

American politician

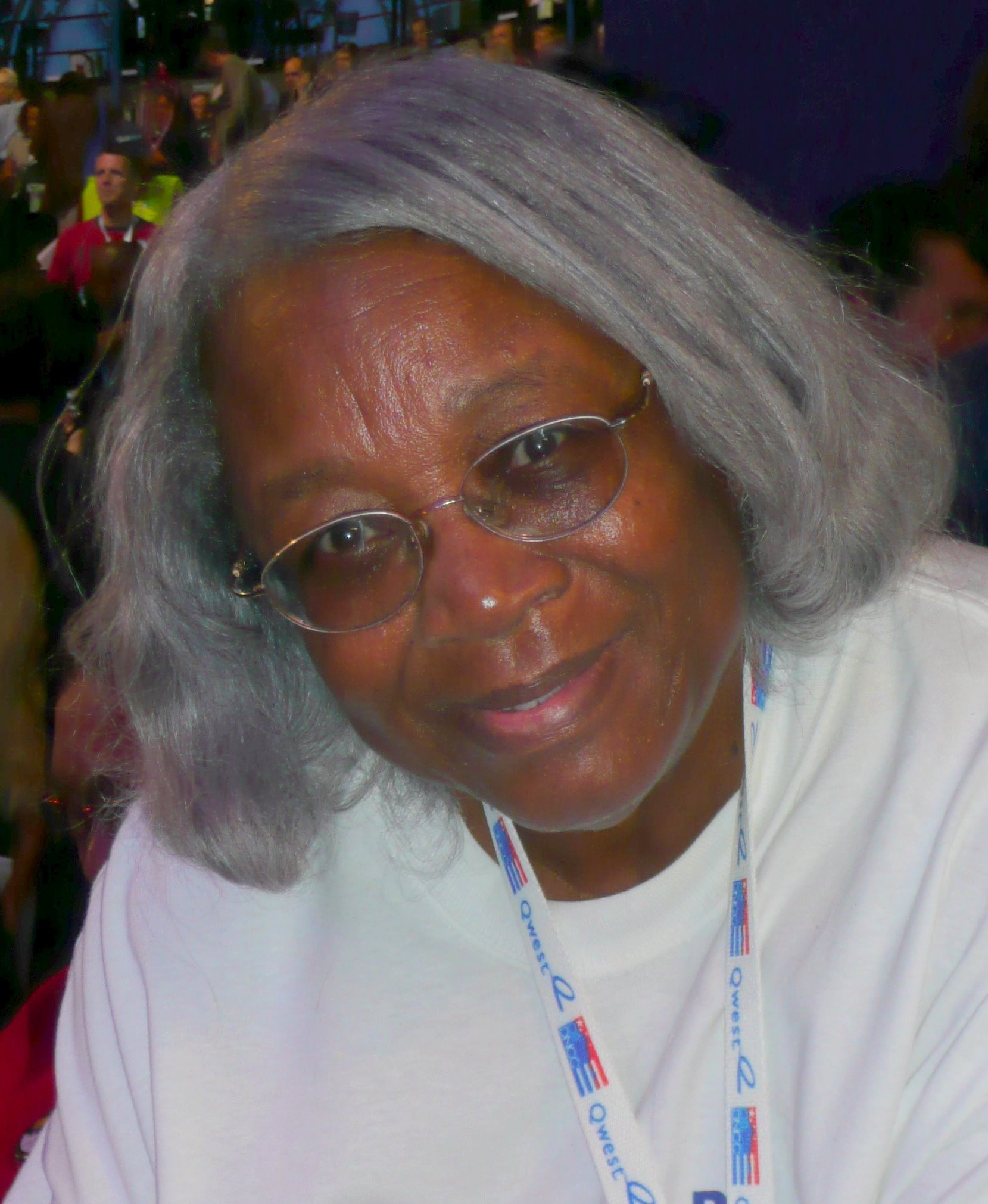
- Yvonne B. Miller at the 2008 Democratic National Convention

Member of the Virginia Senate from the 5th district
- In office January 13, 1988 – July 3, 2012
- Preceded by: Peter K. Babalas
- Succeeded by: Kenny Alexander

Member of the Virginia House of Delegates from the 89th district
- In office January 11, 1984 – January 13, 1988
- Preceded by: Bob Washington
- Succeeded by: Jerrauld Jones

Personal details
- Born: Yvonne Bond; July 4, 1934 Edenton, North Carolina, U.S.
- Died: July 3, 2012 (aged 77) Norfolk, Virginia, U.S.
- Party: Democratic
- Education: Norfolk State University (BS); Columbia University (MA); University of Pittsburgh (PhD)
- Profession: Educator, politician

Yvonne Bond Miller (July 4, 1934 – July 3, 2012) was a Virginia educator and American politician who became the first African-American woman to serve in both houses of the Virginia General Assembly. A Democrat, in 1983 Miller became the first African-American woman elected to the state house, where she served for four years before winning election to the state Senate, where she consistently won re-election until her death in office. Miller taught in the Norfolk Public schools, and later taught early and childhood education at one of her alma maters, which had become Norfolk State University during her lifetime.

== Early life and education ==
Born on Independence Day, 1934 in Edenton, North Carolina, Yvonne Bond was the eldest of what became thirteen children born to John T. and Pency C. Bond. Her family moved to Norfolk, where she attended local public schools, which were then segregated by state law.

After graduation, Bond attended the all-black Norfolk Division of Virginia State College, a historically black college (now Norfolk State University), for two years. In 1956, she earned a B.S. degree from Virginia State College in Petersburg (also a historically black college and which became Virginia State University). While in college, Bond became a lifetime member of Zeta Phi Beta.

In 1962 Miller earned a M.A. degree from the Teachers College of Columbia University and in 1973 she earned a Ph.D in education from the University of Pittsburgh.

== Educator ==
After earning her undergraduate degree (and while pursuing her graduate degrees), Bond taught for twelve years in the Norfolk Public Schools, at first at Young's Park elementary school. They had been segregated by state law since the 19th century and through her childhood.

The U.S. Supreme Court had just issued its decision in Brown v. Board of Education, which required desegregation of public schools, but in Virginia the dominant Byrd Organization reacted with Massive Resistance.

Although the Norfolk public schools (and Arlington public schools in northern Virginia) preferred to respond to lawsuits by the NAACP by desegregating, successive governors and the white-dominated Virginia general assembly enacted laws which permitted the governor to close schools in any district that voluntarily desegregated. Only after both a three-judge federal panel and the Virginia Supreme Court, both on the Lee-Jackson Day state holiday issued decisions declaring those laws unconstitutional did Virginia governor J. Lindsay Almond allow the Norfolk and Arlington public schools to desegregate, in both cases peaceably and pursuant to federal court orders.

Bond joined the education faculty at Norfolk State, where she taught for 31 years. She became a professor and head of the Department of Early Childhood/Elementary Education, before retiring in 1999 and assuming emeritus status.

She was also a life member of National Education Association, served on the boards of the National Alliance of Black School Educators (and was a life member) and Virginia Association for Early Childhood Education, and was active in the Association of University Women, American Association of University Professors (board member).

She hosted a public affairs radio show in Norfolk for many years.

== Political career ==
Miller began to get involved in politics, joining the Democratic Party, although it had long been dominated statewide by the Byrd Organization. Her concerns for education and minority rights made her an "outspoken advocate for Virginia's poor and minorities in the General Assembly". She would later be called the conscience of the Democratic caucus.

In 2010, Miller and Louise Lucas succeeded in having Virginia recognize the Nottoway as among the state's remaining Native American tribes.

In 2012, Miller spoke out against efforts by the state legislature to require voters to bring new identification documents to polling places, claiming this was a Jim Crow-like requirement intended to suppress black voting.

In 1983, Miller became the first black woman to be elected to the Virginia House of Delegates She won re-election and served two terms (from 1984–88). In 1987, she ran and was elected to her first four-year term in the Senate of Virginia. The first African-American woman in Virginia to serve in each house, she was consistently re-elected to the Senate (last facing an opponent in 1995) and died in office.

Miller most recently represented the 5th state senate district, which since 1971 and a redistricting, has been made up of parts of the independent cities of Norfolk, Chesapeake and Virginia Beach.

At the time of her death, Miller was the longest-serving woman in the Virginia Senate, ranking 4th in overall seniority. She gained a seat on the budget-writing Finance Committee. Due to repeatedly being re-elected, she gained seniority. In 1996, she became the first woman to chair a Senate committee, gaining the chair of the Transportation Committee.

== Personal life ==
Miller married and took her husband's surname. She was a lifetime member and an Evangelist Missionary in the Church Of God In Christ, Inc., and a lifetime member of the NAACP.

== Death and legacy ==
On July 3, 2012, Miller died in her Norfolk home from stomach cancer, one day shy of her 78th birthday. She was named among the African American Trailblazers in Virginia History, and in 2013 Gov. McDonnell consolidated the academic campuses at correctional centers operated by the state's Division of Juvenile Justice and renamed them in her honor. The Virginia Poverty Law Center also in 2014 won an award named to honor Sen. Miller. Norfolk State University also established an award to honor her service.

== Notes ==
- "Senator Yvonne B. Miller; Democrat – District 5". Senate of Virginia. Archived from the original on January 15, 2009.
- "Yvonne B. Miller; State Senator, Virginia". Archived from the original on August 5, 2009. (Constituent/campaign website)
