= Lester T. Parker =

American politician

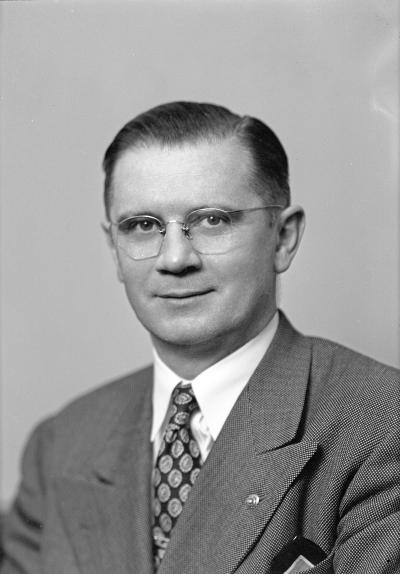
- Parker in 1949

President pro tempore of the Washington Senate
- In office January 10, 1949 – January 8, 1951
- Preceded by: Victor Zednick
- Succeeded by: Ted F. Schroeder

Member of the Washington Senate from the 21st district
- In office January 11, 1943 – January 8, 1951
- Preceded by: Frank L. Morgan
- Succeeded by: Andrew Winberg

Personal details
- Born: Lester Thomas Parker; May 27, 1900 Seattle, Washington, U.S.
- Died: August 8, 1974 (aged 74) Aberdeen, Washington, U.S.
- Party: Republican

Lester Thomas Parker (May 27, 1900 – August 8, 1974) was an American politician in the state of Washington. He served in the Washington State Senate from 1943 to 1951. From 1949 to 1951, he was President pro tempore of the Senate.

Washington State Senate
Preceded by Victor Zednick	President pro tempore of the Washington Senate; 1949–1951	Succeeded by Ted F. Schroeder
