= Jackie Glass (politician) =

American politician (born 1984)

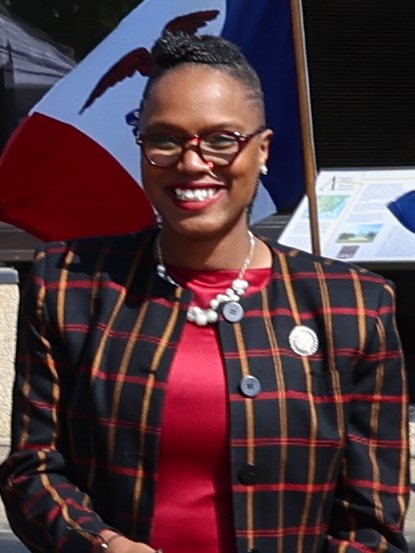
- Glass in 2024

Member of the Virginia House of Delegates
- Incumbent
- Assumed office January 12, 2022
- Preceded by: Jay Jones
- Constituency: 89th district (2022–2024); 93rd district (2024–present)

Personal details
- Born: Jacqueline Hope Glass; 1984 (age 41–42) Chicago, Illinois, U.S.
- Party: Democratic
- Children: 2
- Education: Southern Illinois University Carbondale (BS)

Military service
- Branch/service: United States Navy
- Years of service: 2002–2013

Jacqueline Hope Glass (born 1984) is an American politician and consultant from Virginia. A Democrat, she was first elected to the Virginia House of Delegates in a special election for the 89th district in 2022, winning the seat vacated by retiring Delegate Jay Jones. Glass now represents the 93rd district, which covers part of the city of Norfolk.

== Early life and education ==
Glass was born in Chicago, Illinois. She earned a Bachelor of Science degree in workforce education training and development from the Southern Illinois University Carbondale in 2014.

== Career ==
In 2002, Glass enlisted in the United States Navy and served until 2013.

After graduating from college, Glass moved to Norfolk, Virginia, and has worked as a diversity, equity, and inclusion consultant and instructional system designer. Glass is a member of the NAACP Norfolk branch, the Black Chamber of Commerce, and the Community Emergency Response Team. She was president of the Ballentine Civic League, a board member of Reading Enriches All Children (REACH), a board member of the Young Investors Group, and an ambassador to the United State of Women Summit.

=== Local politics ===
On May 1, 2018, Glass ran for a seat on the Norfolk School Board, placing second with 38.6% of the vote, just 1.9% behind Carlos Clanton. On November 2, 2021, Glass ran in a special election for a seat on the Norfolk City Council, again placing second with 25.8% of the vote behind incumbent Danica Royster.

=== 2022 Virginia House of Delegates special election ===
On January 11, 2022, Glass ran in the special election for the 89th district, held to replace the incumbent Jay Jones. She won with 52.41% of the vote, defeating Republican Giovanni Dolmo.

=== 2023 Virginia House of Delegates election ===
Glass was elected to the 93rd district of the Virginia House of Delegates in 2023.
