= Paul D. Fraim =

American politician and lawyer

Paul Fraim
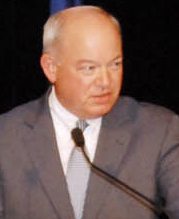

166th Mayor of Norfolk
- In office July 10, 1994 – July 1, 2016
- Preceded by: Mason Andrews
- Succeeded by: Kenny Alexander

Personal details
- Born: Paul David Fraim; October 26, 1949 (age 77) Norfolk, Virginia, U.S.
- Party: Democratic
- Education: Virginia Military Institute (BA); University of Virginia (MEd); University of Richmond (JD)

Paul David Fraim (born October 26, 1949) is an American politician and lawyer. A Democrat, he was elected to the city council of Norfolk, Virginia, in 1986, was appointed mayor of Norfolk on July 1, 1994, and re-appointed every two years until May 2006 when he became the first popularly elected mayor since 1916. He was twice re-elected mayor and did not seek re-election in 2016. He is the longest serving mayor in the history of Norfolk.

== Early life ==
Fraim was born in Norfolk, Virginia. He graduated from Norfolk Catholic High School. He then went on to the Virginia Military Institute, where he was co-captain of the VMI Keydets football team. He received a B.A. degree there, followed by a M.Ed. from the University of Virginia and a J.D. from the University of Richmond School of Law. He coached football at both Virginia and Richmond.

He began practicing law in Norfolk in 1977. For a number of years, he was a law partner of Virginia House of Delegates member George Heilig. After Heilig's death, he left that practice and formed a new law firm, Fraim and Fiorella P.C.

He married Elizabeth Peer, and they have four grown children: Annie, Katie, Richard and David.

== Political career ==
Fraim served as chairman of the Norfolk Electoral Board.

Fraim was elected to the Norfolk City Council in 1986, at a time when the council members were all elected at large. A 1991 Federal court ruling forced Norfolk to adopt a ward system, after which Fraim represented Ward 2 on the west side of the city. When the new council met for the first time on July 1, 1994, it chose Fraim as mayor.

In 2006, Norfolk switched to a directly elected mayor system. Fraim defeated Daniel Montague 78% to 22%.

He was reelected in 2010.

He was again reelected as mayor in 2014, carrying 71% of the vote.

He did not seek reelection in 2016, and was succeeded as Mayor by Kenny Alexander.

== Memberships ==
He is a member of the board of directors of the Hampton Roads Partnership, and the Hampton Roads Economic Development Alliance. He has recently been re-elected to a two-year term as Chair of Hampton Roads Mayors and Chairs Caucus, having previously served as chairman from July 1996 through August 1997. He is a past member of the Board of Directors of the Hampton Roads Chamber of Commerce, Norfolk Division, the Kiwanis Club of Ocean View, the Norfolk Sports Club, and the Navy League. He is a member of the Mayors Against Illegal Guns Coalition, a group with a stated goal of "making the public safer by getting illegal guns off the streets." The Coalition is co-chaired by Boston Mayor Thomas Menino and New York City Mayor Michael Bloomberg.

He has been a member of the Hampton Roads Planning District Commission since 1990 and is currently serving as Vice Chairman. He has also been a commissioner of the Hampton Roads Sports Authority. He is a member of the board of directors of the Greater Norfolk Corporation. He is former Chairman of the Norfolk Highway Safety Commission. He is presently chair of the USS Wisconsin Foundation and is a member of the Virginia Maritime Heritage Foundation.

Fraim is a member of the Virginia State Bar and the Norfolk-Portsmouth Bar Association. He is a member of and has served on the Executive Committee of the Virginia Bar Association, and he is also a fellow of the Virginia Law Foundation.
