= Springton, West Virginia =

- Unincorporated community
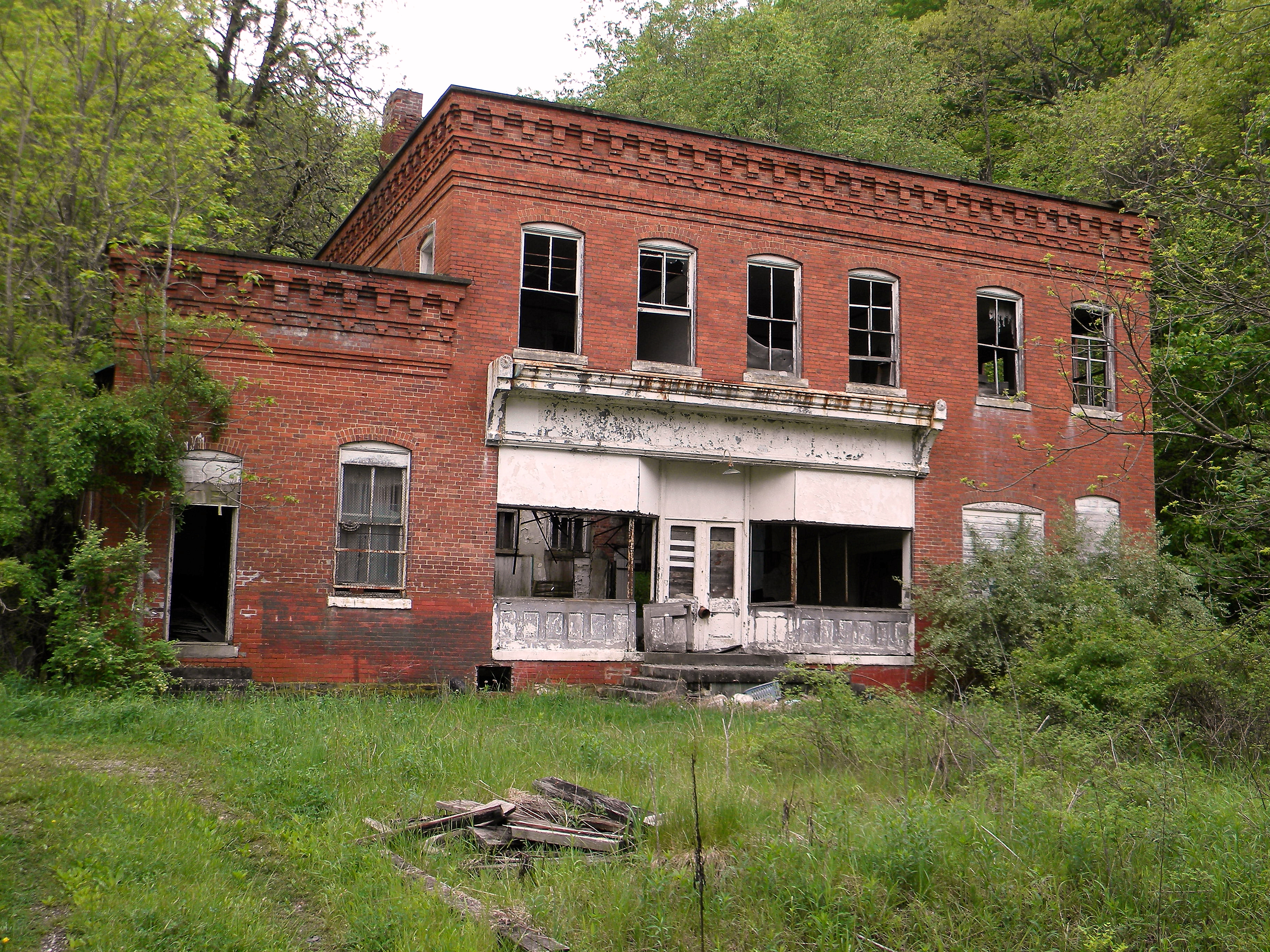
- Abandoned Springton WV Company Store and Post Office

- Location within the state of West Virginia Springton, West Virginia (the United States)
- Coordinates: 37°27′21″N 81°14′39″W
- Country: United States
- State: West Virginia
- County: Mercer
- Elevation: 2,408 ft (734 m)
- Time zone: UTC-5 (Eastern (EST))
  - Summer (DST): UTC-4 (EDT)
- Area codes: 304 & 681
- GNIS feature ID: 1555695

Springton is an unincorporated community and former coal town in Mercer County, West Virginia, United States. Its post office has been closed.
