= 2020 Virginia Beach City Council election =

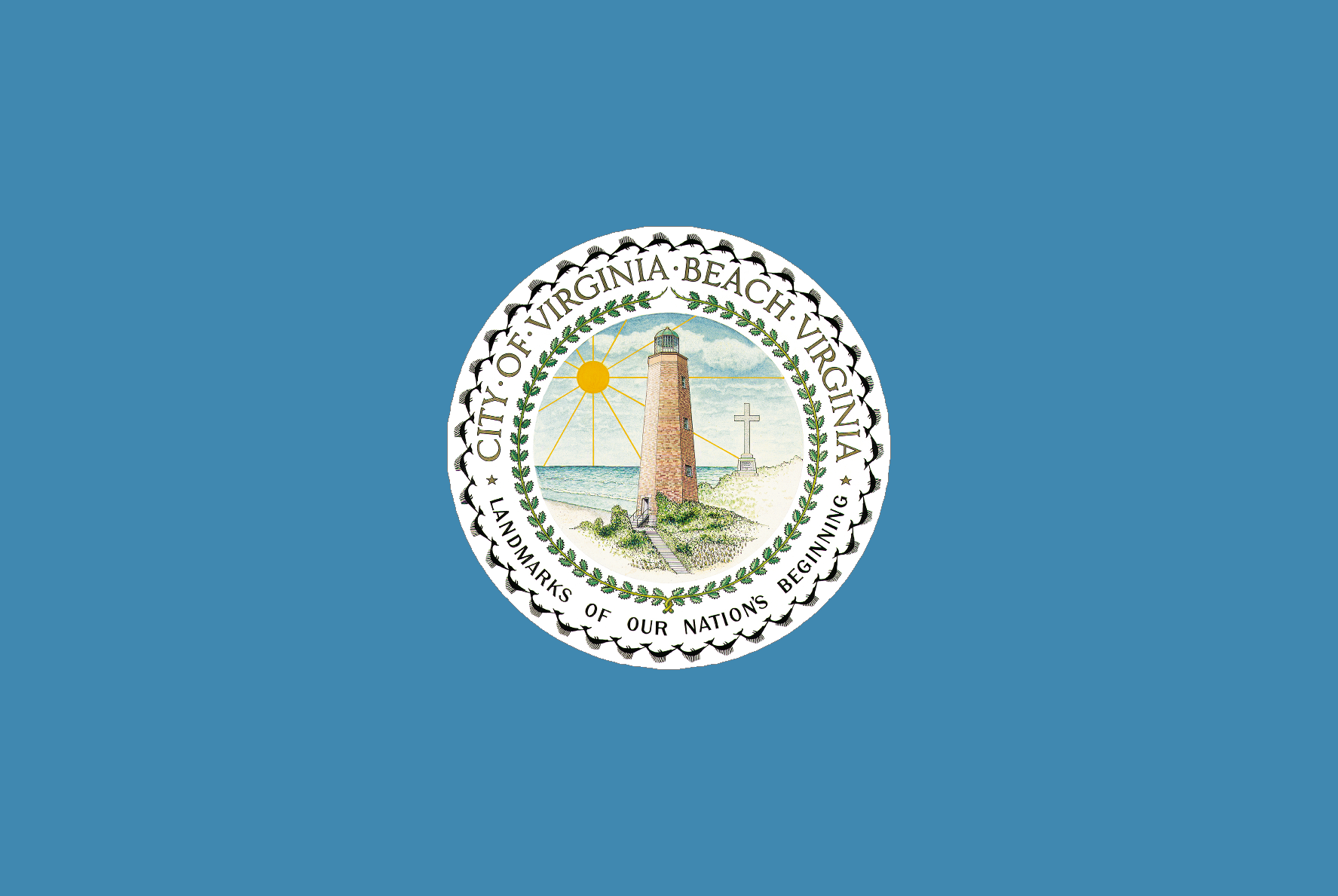
- November 3, 2020

5 seats on the Virginia Beach City Council (Note: Including the Mayor of Virginia Beach's seat on the council which was determined in the 2020 Virginia Beach mayoral election.) 6 seats needed for a majority
| | Majority party | Minority party | Third party |
|---|---|---|---|
| Party | Republican | Democratic | Libertarian |
| Last election | 6 seats, 54.5% | 4 seats, 36.4% | 1 seat, 9.1% |
| Seats won | 3 | 1 | 1 |
| Seat change | 0 | 0 | 0 |

The 2020 elections for members of the Virginia Beach City Council were held on November 3, 2020. Five seats on the council, including the Mayor of Virginia Beach in the 2020 Virginia Beach mayoral election, were up for election in this cycle. While officially nonpartisan, most of the candidates were affiliated with and endorsed by various political parties.

== Background ==
On January 9, 2020, hotel worker C. Conrad Schesventer II announced his campaign for the Virginia Beach City Council to represent the Rose Hall district.

On May 1, 2020, sales representative Mike Anderson declared his candidacy for the Kempsville seat on the City Council. On June 3, 2020, City Council member Michael Berlucchi announced that he would be running for re-election to keep his seat in the Rose Hall district. A day later, retired businessman Garry Hubbard announced his candidacy for the Rose Hall district seat as well. On June 10, 2020, healthcare network support consultant Brandon Hutchins announced that he would be running for the At-Large seat on the council. Nine days later, former delegate from Virginia's 85th house district Cheryl Turpin announced that she would also be challenging council member Berlucchi for his seat in the Rose Hall district.

On July 4, 2020, City Council member Sabrina Wooten announced her re-election campaign for her seat on the council representing the Centerville district. Two days later, financial advisor Bill Dale declared his candidacy for the Kempsville seat on the council. On July 9, 2020, Turpin announced that she was withdrawing from the race for personal reasons specifically concerning her elderly mother. In a statement, she elaborated on her decision saying, "At this time I must intensify my advocacy on behalf of my mother, who is 87 years old and suffering from cognitive changes, as challenges attached to the current COVID-19 crisis increase." A day later, City Council member Jessica Abbott announced that she would be running for her incumbent seat representing the Kempsville district. Two days after that, funeral director Eric Wray II declared that he would be challenging Wooten for her seat on the council serving the Centerville district.

On July 22, 2020, Lucia Owen, a candidate for an at-large seat on the Virginia Beach City Council, announced that she was withdrawing from the race due to family priorities. She said that she had recently been involved in a car accident and she was currently pregnant and concerned about going out campaigning during the ongoing COVID-19 pandemic. That same day, longtime City Council member Rosemary Wilson announced that she would be running for a sixth term representing the at-large seat.

On August 4, 2020, businesswoman Nadine Marie Paniccia announced that she too would be seeking to challenge council member Wilson for the at-large seat on the council. On September 14, 2020, Anderson announced that he was withdrawing from the Kempsville election.

On November 4, 2020, results confirmed that all five incumbents on the council, including Wilson, Wooten, Abbott, Berlucchi, and Dyer, had won re-election.

== Candidates ==
=== At-Large ===
| Candidate | Experience | Logo | Campaign announced | Party (Officially nonpartisan) | References |
|---|---|---|---|---|---|
| Rosemary Wilson | Virginia Beach City Council Member (2002–present) | (Website) | July 22, 2020 | Republican | |
| Brandon Hutchins | Healthcare Network Support Consultant | (Website) | June 10, 2020 | Democratic | |
| Nadine Marie Paniccia | Advertising Sales Executive | (Website) | August 4, 2020 | Independent | |

==== Withdrew before the election ====
| Candidate | Experience | Logo | Campaign announced | Campaign suspended | Party (Officially nonpartisan) | References |
|---|---|---|---|---|---|---|
| Lucia Owen | Digital Marketing Manager | (Website) | Unknown | July 22, 2020 | Republican | |

=== Centerville district ===
| Candidate | Experience | Logo | Campaign announced | Party (Officially nonpartisan) | References |
|---|---|---|---|---|---|
| Sabrina Wooten | Virginia Beach City Council Member (2019–present) | (Website) | July 4, 2020 | Democratic | |
| Eric Wray II | Funeral Director | (Website) | July 12, 2020 | Republican | |

=== Kempsville district ===
| Candidate | Experience | Logo | Campaign announced | Party (Officially nonpartisan) | References |
|---|---|---|---|---|---|
| Jessica Abbott | Virginia Beach City Council Member (2017–present) | (Website) | July 10, 2020 | Libertarian | |
| Bill Dale | Financial Advisor | (Website) | July 6, 2020 | Democratic | |

==== Withdrew before the election ====
| Candidate | Experience | Logo | Campaign announced | Campaign suspended | Party (Officially nonpartisan) | References |
|---|---|---|---|---|---|---|
| Mike Anderson | Architectural/Commercial Sales Representative for Brick Company | (Website) | May 1, 2020 | September 14, 2020 | Republican | |

=== Rose Hall district ===
| Candidate | Experience | Logo | Campaign announced | Party (Officially nonpartisan) | References |
|---|---|---|---|---|---|
| Michael Berlucchi | Virginia Beach City Council Member (2019–present) | (Website) | June 3, 2020 | Republican | |
| C. Conrad Schesventer II | Front Desk Hotel Worker | (Website) | January 9, 2020 | Democratic | |
| Garry Hubbard | Construction Contractor | | June 4, 2020 | Democratic | |

==== Withdrew before the election ====
| Candidate | Experience | Logo | Campaign announced | Campaign suspended | Party (Officially nonpartisan) | References |
|---|---|---|---|---|---|---|
| Cheryl Turpin | Delegate from Virginia House District 85 (2018–2020) | (Website) | June 19, 2020 | July 9, 2020 | Democratic | |

== Endorsements ==
=== At Large ===
Rosemary Wilson

State legislators

- Jen Kiggans, Virginia State Senator from District 7 (2020-present)

Organizations

- Hampton Roads Black Caucus
- Hampton Roads Chamber of Commerce
- Hampton Roads Realtors Association
- Republican Party of Virginia Beach
- Virginia Beach Education Association - Political Action Committee of Educators (VBEA-PACE)
- Virginia Beach Police Benevolent Association, Local 34
- Virginia Beach Professional Firefighters Local 2924
Brandon Hutchins

U.S. Representatives

- Elaine Luria, U.S. Representative from VA-02 (2019-present)

State legislators

- Kelly Convirs-Fowler, Virginia Delegate from District 21 (2018-present)
- Nancy Guy, Virginia Delegate from District 83 (2020-2022)
- Alex Askew, Virginia Delegate from District 85 (2020-2022)

Local officials

- Aaron Rouse, Member of the Virginia Beach City Council, At Large (2019-present)
- Guy Tower, Member of the Virginia Beach City Council, Beach District (2019-present)

Organizations

- Mid-Atlantic Pipe Trades Association, Plumbers & Pipefitters Local Union 110
- Virginia Beach Democratic Committee
Nadine Marie Paniccia

Organizations

- African American Political Action Council (AA PAC)

=== Centerville district ===
Sabrina Wooten

Local officials

- Aaron Rouse, Member of the Virginia Beach City Council, At Large (2019-present)

Organizations

- African American Political Action Council (AA PAC)
- Hampton Roads Black Caucus
- Hampton Roads Realtors Association
- Mid-Atlantic Pipe Trades Association, Plumbers & Pipefitters Local Union 110
- Virginia Beach Democratic Committee
- Virginia Beach Education Association - Political Action Committee of Educators (VBEA-PACE)
- Virginia Beach Professional Firefighters Local 2924
Eric Wray II

State legislators

- Jen Kiggans, Virginia State Senator from District 7 (2020-present)
- Barry Knight, Virginia Delegate from District 81 (2009-present)

Local officials

- John Moss, Member of Virginia Beach City Council, At Large (2011-present)
- Ken Stolle, Sheriff of Virginia Beach (2010-present), Virginia State Senator from District 8 (1992-2010)

Organizations

- Republican Party of Virginia Beach
- Virginia Beach Fraternal Order of Police, Lodge 8
- Virginia Beach Police Benevolent Association, Local 34
- Virginia Citizens Defense League PAC

=== Kempsville district ===
Jessica Abbott

State legislators

- Jen Kiggans, Virginia State Senator from District 7 (2020-present)
- Glenn Davis, Virginia Delegate from District 84 (2014-present), Member of the Virginia Beach City Council, Rose Hall District (2009-2013)

Local officials

- Bobby Dyer, Mayor of Virginia Beach (2018-present)
- John Moss, Member of Virginia Beach City Council, At Large (2011-present)

Organizations

- African American Political Action Council (AA PAC)
- Hampton Roads Chamber of Commerce
- Hampton Roads Realtors Association
- Republican Party of Virginia Beach
Bill Dale

Organizations

- Hampton Roads Black Caucus
- Virginia Beach Democratic Committee
- Virginia Beach Education Association - Political Action Committee of Educators (VBEA-PACE)
- Virginia Beach Fraternal Order of Police, Lodge 8
- Virginia Beach Police Benevolent Association, Local 34
- Virginia Beach Professional Firefighters, Local 2924

=== Rose Hall district ===
Michael Berlucchi

State legislators

- Jen Kiggans, Virginia State Senator from District 7 (2020-present)
- Barry Knight, Virginia Delegate from District 81 (2009-present)

Local officials

- John Moss, Member of Virginia Beach City Council, At Large (2011-present)
- Ken Stolle, Sheriff of Virginia Beach (2010-present), Virginia State Senator from District 8 (1992-2010)
- Colin Stolle, Commonwealth's Attorney for the City of Virginia Beach (2013-present)
- Tina Sinnen, Clerk of the Virginia Beach Circuit Court (2019-present)

Individuals

- Beatriz Amberman, Chair of The Virginia Coalition of Latino Organizations

Organizations

- African American Political Action Council (AA PAC)
- Hampton Roads Black Caucus
- Hampton Roads Chamber of Commerce
- Hampton Roads Realtors Association
- Republican Party of Virginia Beach
- Virginia Beach Education Association - Political Action Committee of Educators (VBEA-PACE)
- Virginia Beach Fraternal Order of Police, Lodge 8
- Virginia Beach Hospitality PAC
- Virginia Beach Police Benevolent Association, Local 34
- Virginia Beach Professional Firefighters Local 2924
C. Conrad Schesventer II

Organizations

- Virginia Beach Democratic Committee

== Results ==
2020 Virginia Beach City Council Election, At-Large (A)
| Party | Candidate | Votes | % |
|---|---|---|---|
| Nonpartisan | Rosemary A. Wilson | 108,723 | 53.89 |
| Nonpartisan | Brandon C. Hutchins | 71,577 | 35.47 |
| Nonpartisan | Nadine Marie Paniccia | 20,820 | 10.32 |
| | Write-in | 649 | 0.32 |
| Total votes | | 201,769 | 100 |

2020 Virginia Beach City Council Election, Centerville District
| Party | Candidate | Votes | % |
|---|---|---|---|
| Nonpartisan | Sabrina D. Wooten | 102,645 | 44.90 |
| Nonpartisan | Eric V. Wray, II | 84,098 | 54.81 |
| | Write-in | 542 | 0.29 |
| Total votes | | 187,285 | 100 |

2020 Virginia Beach City Council Election, Kempsville District
| Party | Candidate | Votes | % |
|---|---|---|---|
| Nonpartisan | Jessica P. Abbott | 116,971 | 62.38 |
| Nonpartisan | William J. "Bill" Dale | 70,030 | 37.35 |
| | Write-in | 498 | 0.27 |
| Total votes | | 187,499 | 100 |

2020 Virginia Beach City Council Election, Rose Hall District
| Party | Candidate | Votes | % |
|---|---|---|---|
| Nonpartisan | Michael F. Berlucchi | 106,091 | 57.53 |
| Nonpartisan | C. Conrad Schesventer II | 50,986 | 27.65 |
| Nonpartisan | Garry B. Hubbard | 26,578 | 14.41 |
| | Write-in | 752 | 0.41 |
| Total votes | | 184,407 | 100 |
