= First Colonial High School =

Public high school in Virginia, US

Location
- 1272 Mill Dam Road; Virginia Beach, Virginia 23454; United States; 36°52′24″N 76°1′43″W

Information
- School type: Public, high school
- Founded: 1966
- Locale: City, Large
- School district: Virginia Beach City Public Schools
- Superintendent: Donald E. Robertson
- Principal: Caitlin Riley
- Teaching staff: 94.49 (on an FTE basis)
- Grades: 9–12
- Enrollment: 1,727 (2024–25)
- Student to teacher ratio: 18.28
- Colors: Columbia blue and gold
- Athletics conference: Virginia High School League; Beach District; Eastern Region
- Nickname: Patriots
- Rival: Cox High School
- Communities served: Croatan Beach, Kings Grant, Shadowlawn, Alanton, Baycliff
- Website: firstcolonialhs.vbschools.com

First Colonial High School is a high school in Virginia Beach, Virginia. It is a part of the Virginia Beach City Public Schools, serving 1,727 students (2024–25).

== Demographics ==
The demographic breakdown of the 1,727 students enrolled in 2024–25 was:

- Male – 48.1%
- Female – 51.9%
- Native American/Alaskan – 0.3%
- Asian/Pacific islanders – 3%
- Black – 17.2%
- Hispanic – 16.6%
- White – 55%
- Multiracial – 7.9%

31% of the students were eligible for free or reduced lunch.

== Legal Studies Academy ==
Virginia Beach City Public Schools is known for its academy system. First Colonial High School hosts the Legal Studies Academy, which provides students who have an interest in and curiosity about the law, law-related fields, and legal and ethical issues the opportunity to extend their knowledge beyond the typical high school program.

== Athletics ==
First Colonial offers many sports, including:

- Baseball
  - State champs - 1993, 2024.
- Basketball
- Competition Cheer
- Sideline Cheer
- Cross Country
- Field hockey

•Lacrosse

  - State champs - 2011, 2012 & 2015.
- Football
- Gymnastics
- Indoor Track
- Soccer
  - Girls state champs - 2018, 2021
  - Boys state champs - 2021
- Softball
  - Diving
- Swimming
  - Girls state champs 2020, 2021, 2022, 2023
- Tennis
  - Girls state champs - 1977, 1982, 2011
- Track
- Volleyball
  - Boys state champs - 1997
  - Girls state champs - 2000, 2002, 2014, 2023
- Wrestling

== Notable alumni ==
- Wade Barrett - soccer player
- Josh Boone - filmmaker
- Derrick Borte - filmmaker
- Steven Culp - actor
- Raven Greene - football player
- Skylar Johnston - softball player
- Darryl Monroe - basketball player, 2016 Israeli Basketball Premier League MVP
- Guy Morgan - basketball player
- Juice Newton - singer
- Brandon Noble - football player
- Mark Reynolds - baseball player
- Aaron Rouse - football player and politician
- Mark Ruffalo - actor
- Will Sessoms - politician
- Kendra Todd - reality television personality
- Jeff Ware - baseball player and coach
- Carroll Wiseman - late wife of Artemis II astronaut, namesake of Lunar Crater Carroll

== See also ==
- AAA Eastern Region
- AAA Beach District
