= 2023 Virginia's 7th Senate district special election =

2023 Virginia Senate 7th District special election
- January 10, 2023

Virginia's 7th Senate district
- Turnout: 25%
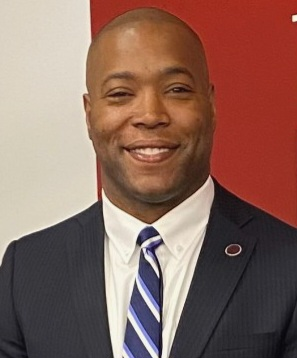

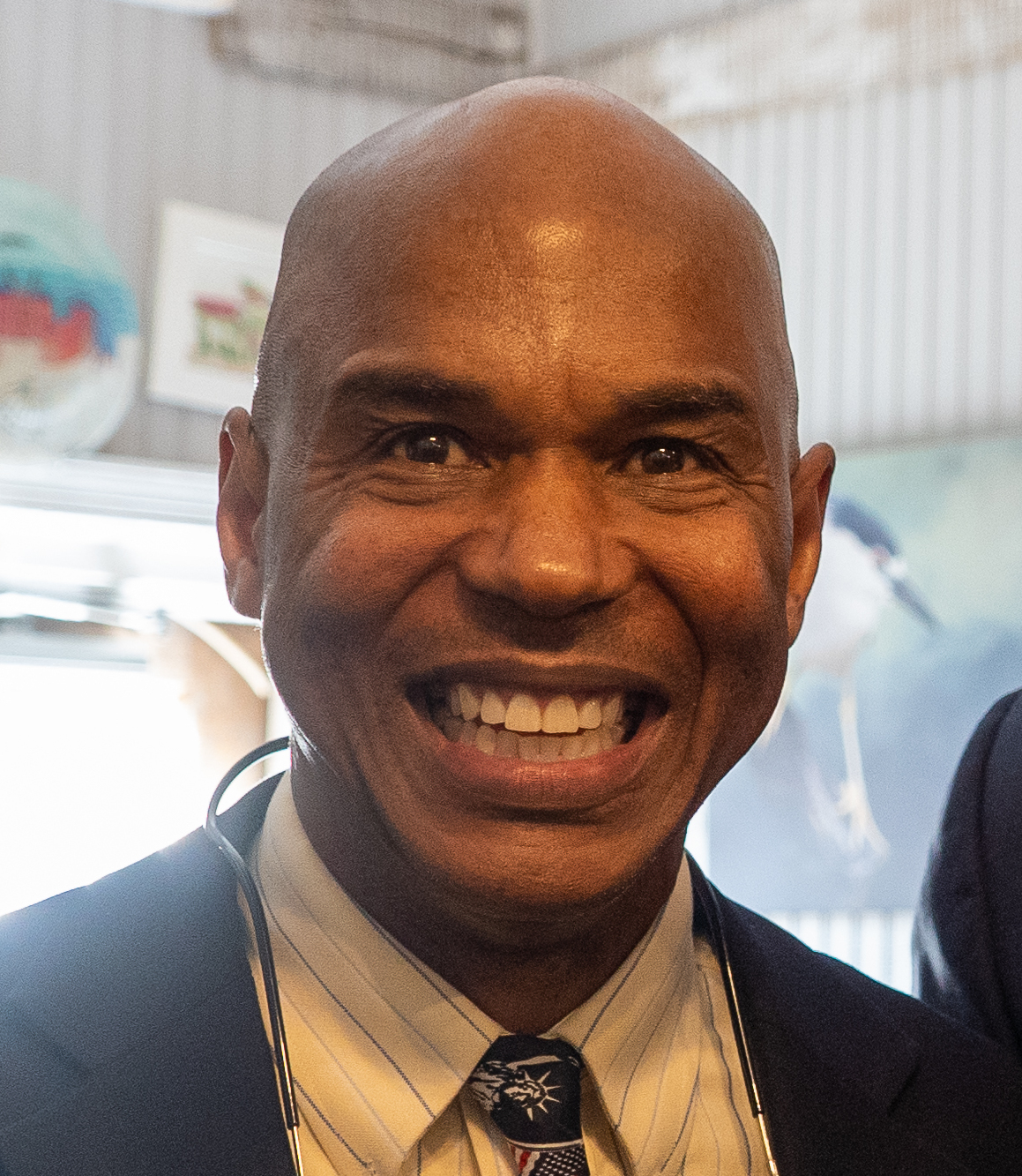
Candidate	Aaron Rouse	Kevin H. Adams
Party	Democratic	Republican
Popular vote	19,923	19,227
Percentage	50.84%	49.07%
- Precinct results Rouse: 50–60% 60–70% 70–80% 80–90% Adams: 50–60% 60–70%
Senator before election
Jen Kiggans
Republican
Elected Senator
Aaron Rouse
Democratic

On January 10, 2023, voters in the 7th district of the Virginia Senate voted in a special election to fill the seat left vacant by Republican Jen Kiggans, the previous incumbent, who had resigned on January 3, 2023, after having been elected to Congress the preceding November. New state legislative maps took effect on January 11, 2023, at the start of 2023 legislative. However, this special election took place under previous district lines. As a result of the redistricting process, the 7th district became the 22nd district in November,. (Note: District 7 and the new 22 overlap significantly) Final official vote tallies were not released until January 13 because mail-in ballots were accepted after election day if postmarked for January 10. Democrat Aaron Rouse, an at-large Virginia Beach City Council member and former professional football player defeated Republican Kevin Adams, a retired U.S. Navy lieutenant commander and small business owner.

== Background ==
Prior to this election, Virginia Democrats held a 21–18 majority in the Virginia Senate. Virginia Republicans hoped to retain to their seat to prevent the Democratic caucus from expanding. Although this election was seen as both a bellwether heading into the 2023 Virginia elections in November and a popularity test for incumbent governor Glenn Youngkin, observers also viewed the race as a small part of the much larger abortion debate in Virginia as well as the rest of the country. This special election comes on the bootheels of Governor Youngkin's proposal to ban abortion in Virginia after 15 weeks of pregnancy with exceptions for rape, incest, and to preserve the mother's life. While the Senate President pro tempore Louise Lucas and the Virginia Senate Democrats have said that they oppose this restriction, there had been a couple of conservative-leaning Democrats who agree with this proposal. The result of this special election help determine the legislative viability of the 15-week ban. Virginia currently allows abortion through the second trimester, about 26 weeks, and in the third only if the mother's life or health is at serious risk, as certified by three doctors.

Virginia holds off-year elections, and the Senate is up for renewal in November 2023, thus the special election's victor would only serve for a single year. Republican Jen Kiggans, whose election to the United States House of Representatives prompted the special election, narrowly won this seat in 2019 by a margin of 0.87% or 511 votes. It was the closest seat in the 2019 Virginia Senate election. When Kiggans resigned to take her place in the 118th Congress, Democrats mobilized in hopes of flipping the district. Seeing as the 7th (soon to be 22nd) district was drawn to be more favorable for Democrats, if Aaron Rouse won, it would mean that he would have a better chance to hold on to his seat in the upcoming elections. Some pundits have already portrayed the 2023 Virginia Elections as being a "referendum" on Governor Youngkin. The failure of the Virginia Republicans in November could affect the decision for Youngkin to run for President of the United States in 2024, as some pundits have suggested.

=== The 7th Senate District ===
Virginia's 7th State Senate district

- Virginia's 7th Senate district had been located in the Hampton Roads metropolitan area in southeastern Virginia, including much of Virginia Beach and a small part of Norfolk. As of December 2022, the district was located entirely within Virginia's 2nd congressional district, and overlapped with the 21st, 82nd, 83rd, 85th, and 90th districts of the Virginia House of Delegates.
- The district fully or mostly incorporated Virginia Beach City Council Districts 9 (Bayside), District 4 (Rosemont, Middleton), District 1 (Homestead, Avalon Hills), and District 7 (Charlestown). It also incorporates parts of District 3 (Kempsville), half of District 8 (Thalia, Malibu), and precinct 103 located in District 10 (near the Plaza Azteca on the corner of Holland & Plaza Trail.) The district composes most of the old Princess Anne County Magisterial Districts of Bayside and Kempsville. In regards to the parts of the district in Norfolk, the precincts of Azalea Gardens, Little Creek, and half of Tarrallton are included.
- As of the 2020 United States census, District 7 is home to 218,178. The district is majority white with 55.5% of the population reporting as such. A further 23.1% of the district reported as Black or African American, 9.4% as Asian, 7.8% as Hispanic and/or Latino, and 2.7% as some other race. According to the U.S. Census, the district has a median income of $73.3k, a high school graduation rate of 93.2%, and a college graduation rate of 35.6%.
- This district is 100% urban. It incorporates many older neighborhoods in Virginia Beach. It also includes Virginia Beach Town Center within its borders. Even though the district is home to a large population of active and retired veterans, up to 25% in parts of the district according to some estimates, it only incorporates a small part of Joint Expeditionary Base-Little Creek. The presence of the military in this district is very hard to miss. Of the previous nine state senators who have served in districts covering this area, six were military veterans, mostly navy.

Politically speaking, this district had not been unaffected by the "blue shift" within suburban America over the last decade. While it had been competitive on the federal and state-wide level, it has traditionally been more favorable to Republicans in State Senate elections. Frank Wagner was the state senator in District 7 prior to Jen Kiggans. He served from 2001 until his resignation in 2019. He won a consecutive sting of uncompetitive and uncontested elections up until 2015, when he still managed to run ahead of the state-wide margin. Because Virginia State Senate Elections always happen in the middle of a gubernatorial term it makes it hard to make a 1:1 direct comparison. Even still, whenever the Democrat managed to win the district on the federal or state-wide, it would be several more points to the right the following senate election due to down-ballot lag. According to the VPAP, during the 2022 United States Congressional election, Kiggans ran four points behind incumbent Elaine Luria in her own district, even after Youngkin won the seat by four the year before. District 7 has in the last few years, just like the city it is a part of, become prone to varying swings election to election, and often has a marginal result. The result that District 7 produced for the special election was yet again marginal, and yet again several points to the right compared to the Congressional results not even nine weeks ago.

Year	Office	Results
2021	Governor	Youngkin 51.6-47.6%
2020	President	Biden 54.1–44.1%
2017	Governor	Northam 53.5–45.3%
2016	President	Clinton 47.1–46.9%
2014	Senate	Gillespie 49.9–47.4%
2013	Governor	Cuccinelli 47.1–46.4%
2012	President	Obama 49.5–49.1%
2012	Senate	Kaine 51.7–48.3%

== Candidates ==
Democrat Aaron Rouse, an At-large Virginia Beach City Council member since 2018, ran against retired U.S. Navy lieutenant commander and small business owner Kevin Adams.

== Campaign ==
=== Fundraising ===
Candidate Fundraising as of Jan 4, 2023
Adams Raised	989.7k
Adams Spent	852.8k
Rouse Raised	977.8k
Rouse Spent	899.5k

== Election ==
2023 Virginia's 7th Senate district special election
Party	Candidate	Votes	%
Democratic	Aaron Rouse	19,923	50.84
Republican	Kevin Adams	19,227	49.07
Democratic gain from Republican			

Notably, early in person and early mail in votes were not allocated by precinct. Adams won the early in person votes in the district by 34 votes or 0.6%, but Rouse won early mail in votes by 2,745 votes or 44%. Rouse's raw margin of victory in absentee votes was significantly greater than his raw margin of victory in the district overall.

== See also ==
- Results of the other special elections
- Politics of Virginia
