= 2023 Virginia elections =

- November 7, 2023

The 2023 Virginia elections took place on November 7, 2023. All 40 seats of the Virginia Senate and 100 seats in the Virginia House of Delegates were up for election, as are many local offices.

Special elections also will take place during the year.

== Federal ==
=== 2023 Virginia's 4th congressional district special election ===
A special election was held on February 21, 2023, to fill Virginia's 4th congressional district for the remainder of Democrat Donald McEachin's term, who died on November 28, 2022, of colorectal cancer. The Democratic nominee Jennifer McClellan won the special election.

== State ==
=== Special elections ===
==== Virginia's 24th House of Delegates district ====
An election was held on January 10, 2023, to fill Virginia's 24th House of Delegates district, following the death of Republican incumbent Ronnie R. Campbell on December 13, 2022, due to cancer.

==== Virginia's 35th House of Delegates district ====
An election was held on January 10, 2023, to fill Virginia's 35th House of Delegates district, following the resignation of Democratic incumbent Mark Keam on September 6, 2022, to become Deputy Assistant Secretary for Travel and Tourism within the International Trade Administration.

==== Virginia's 7th Senate district ====
2023 Virginia Senate 7th District special election
- January 10, 2023

Virginia’s 7th state senate district
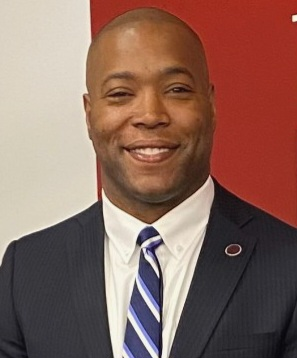

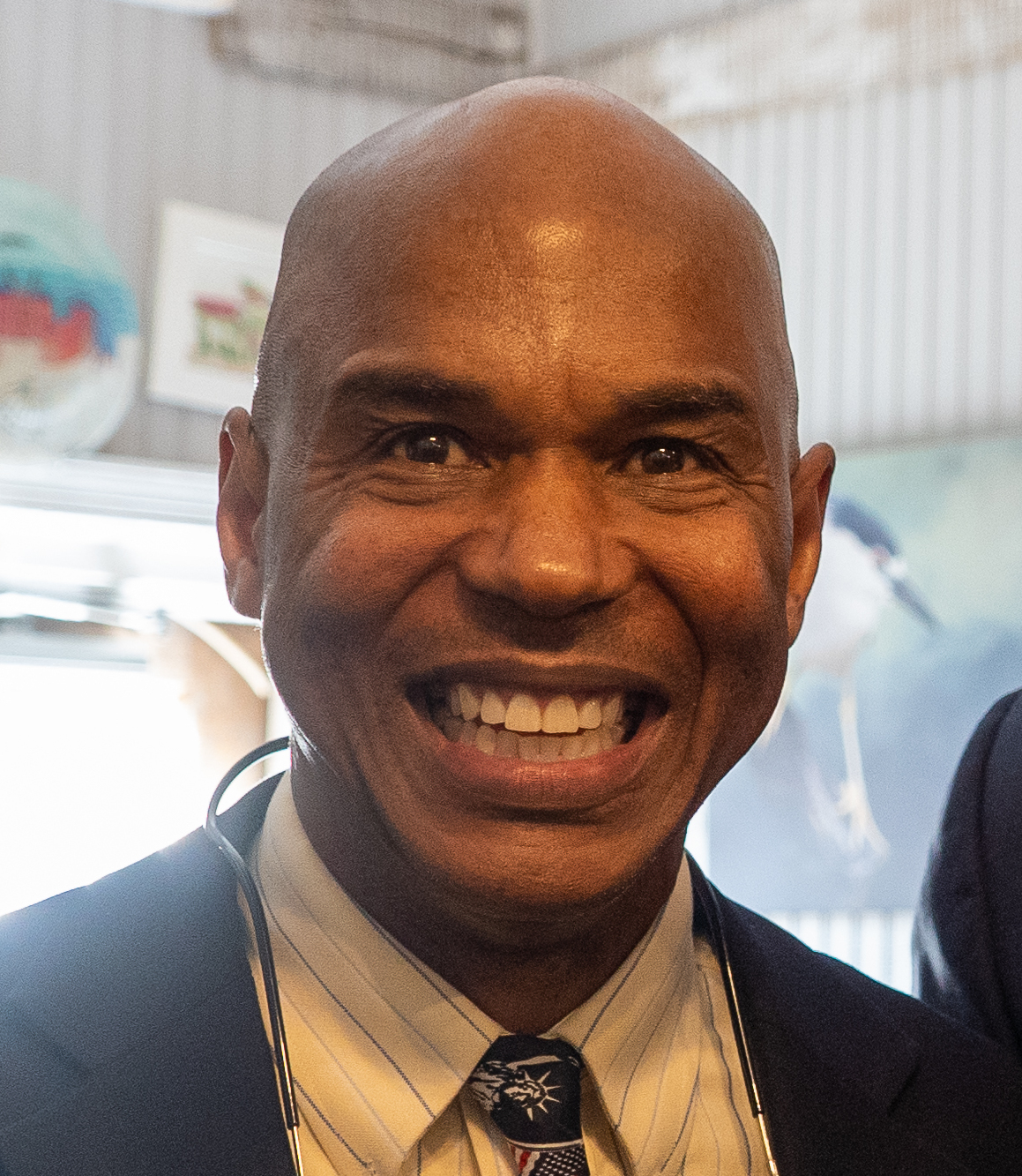
Candidate	Aaron Rouse	Kevin H. Adams
Party	Democratic	Republican
Popular vote	19,923	19,227
Percentage	50.84%	49.07%
- Precinct results Rouse: 50–60% 60–70% 70–80% 80–90% Adams: 50–60% 60–70%
State senator before election
Jen Kiggans
Republican
Elected State senator
Aaron Rouse
Democratic

An election was held on January 10, 2023, to fill Virginia's 7th Senate district, following the resignation of Republican incumbent Jen Kiggans on November 15, 2022, to become a U.S. Representative. Democrat Aaron Rouse, an at-large Virginia Beach City Council member since 2018, narrowly defeated Republican Kevin Adams, a retired U.S. Navy lieutenant commander and small business owner. With the election of Rouse, the district was flipped from Republican to Democratic control.

New state legislative maps took effect on January 11, 2023, at the start of 2023 legislative session; however, this special election took place under previous district lines.
