= Bobby Dyer (politician) =

Mayor of Virginia Beach, Virginia, United States

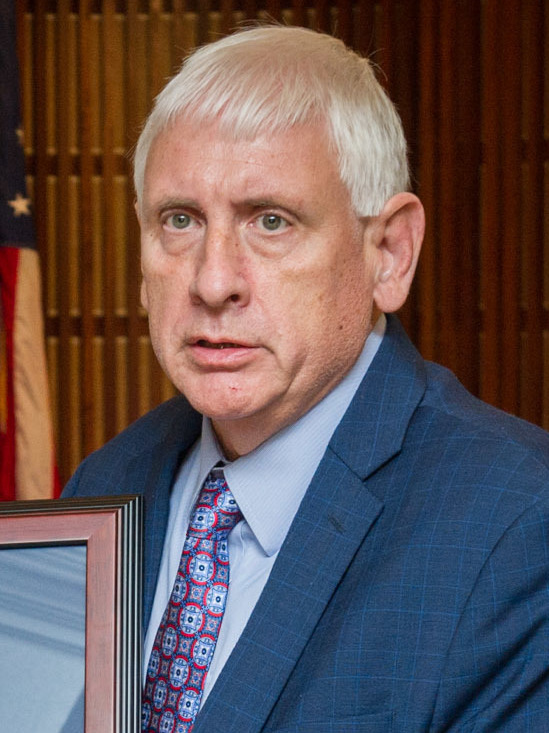

25th Mayor of Virginia Beach
- Incumbent
- Assumed office November 20, 2018
- Preceded by: Will Sessoms

Member of the Virginia Beach City Council from the Centerville district
- In office July 1, 2004 – November 19, 2018
- Preceded by: Margaret Eure
- Succeeded by: Sabrina Wooten

Personal details
- Born: August 10, 1950 (age 76) Newark, New Jersey, U.S.
- Party: Republican
- Spouse: Trish Dyer
- Education: Saint Louis University (BS); Fairleigh Dickinson University (MPA); Regent University (PhD)

Military service
- Branch/service: United States Marine Corps
- Years of service: 1968–1972

Robert M. Dyer (born August 10, 1950) is an American politician who has served as the mayor of Virginia Beach, Virginia, since 2018. Dyer previously served as a member of the Virginia Beach City Council for 14 years.

== Early life and education ==
Dyer was born at the Newark Beth Israel Medical Center in Newark, New Jersey, and raised in Elizabeth, New Jersey. He attended Irvington High School, leaving early to join the United States Marine Corps. Dyer earned a Bachelor of Science degree in physical therapy from Saint Louis University, Master of Public Administration from Fairleigh Dickinson University, and a PhD in organizational leadership from Regent University.

== Career ==
A Republican, Dyer served as a member of the Virginia Beach City Council for 14 years prior to his election as mayor. Dyer has also been a physical therapist for over 40 years and a professor of government at his alma mater, Regent University. He won the November 2018 election for mayor despite being outraised by his opponent Ben Davenport nearly 5 to 1.

Dyer ran for re-election for mayor in 2020. On June 9, 2020, Jody Wagner announced she would run for the seat; Dyer's previous opponent, City Councilman Aaron Rouse, ended his campaign on May 30, 2020. Dyer won a second term as mayor against Wagner in the November 2020 election.

Dyer ran for re-election for mayor in 2024, facing four opponents. Dyer won a third term as mayor against Councilmember Sabrina Wooten, former Councilmember John Moss, Councilmember Chris Taylor and Richard Kowalewitch.

== Electoral history ==
Virginia Beach's mayoral special election, 2018
Party	Candidate	Votes	%
Nonpartisan	Bobby Dyer	82,201	51.8
Nonpartisan	M. Ben Davenport	75,693	47.7
	Write-in	789	0.5
Total votes		158,683	100.0

Virginia Beach's mayoral election, 2020
Party	Candidate	Votes	%
Nonpartisan	Bobby Dyer (incumbent)	111,736	51.7
Nonpartisan	Jody Wagner	94,507	43.7
Nonpartisan	Richard W. "RK" Kowalewitch	9,251	4.2
	Write-in	335	0.1
Total votes		215,829	100.0

== See also ==
- List of mayors of the 50 largest cities in the United States

Political offices
Preceded by Will Sessoms	Mayor of Virginia Beach; 2018–present	Incumbent
