= Virginia Beach Public Library System =

Public library system in Virginia, U.S.

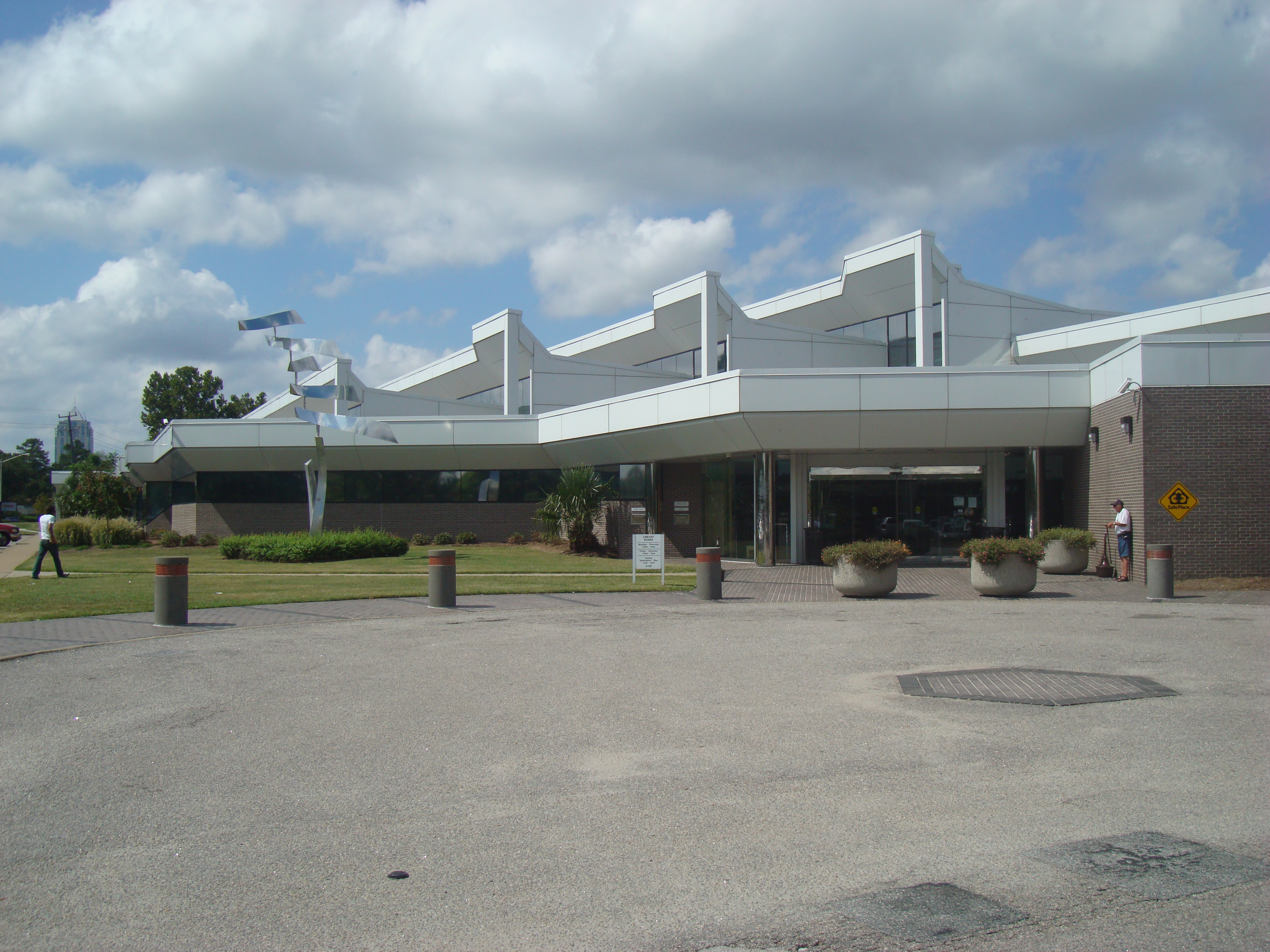
- Meyera E. Oberndorf Central Library
- Location: Virginia Beach, Virginia, U.S.
- Established: 1930
- Branches: 10

Collection
- Size: > 1 million items

Other information
- Director: Kimberly Knight
- Website: https://libraries.virginiabeach.gov

Virginia Beach Public Library (VBPL), located in Virginia Beach, Virginia is a comprehensive library system serving Virginia Beach, an independent city with a population of 450,000 in the Hampton Roads metropolitan area of Virginia. The library supports the educational and leisure needs of citizens with a system of area libraries, a bookmobile, a virtual library, the Wahab Public Law Library, the Municipal Reference Library, and the Library and Resource Center for the Deaf, Blind, and Visually Impaired (DBVI). The collection contains more than 1 million print and non-print items.

== History ==
The VBPL was established in 1930 with only one branch. The system was forced to grow when Virginia Beach first became an independent city, and again when Princess Anne County was merged with the city.

== Branches ==
VBPL has 11 locations including a joint-use library with a community college, a law library, and a bookmobile for early literacy outreach. The different library buildings range in size from the large 90,000-square-foot (8,400 m^{2}) Central Library on busy Virginia Beach Boulevard to the much smaller Pungo-Blackwater Library attached to Creeds Elementary School on Princess Anne Road. Library locations include the Central Library, Bayside Special Service Library, Great Neck Area Library, Kempsville Area Library, Oceanfront Area Library, Princess Anne Area Library, Pungo-Blackwater Library, TCC/City Joint-Use Library, Windsor Woods Area Library. On December 10, 2008, just before Meyera E. Oberndorf's 21-year run as city mayor ended, the city council unanimously voted to rename the city's Central Library the Meyera E. Oberndorf Central Library.

== Programs ==
VBPL offers a wide variety of programs for kids, teens, and adults. These vary between one-off programs done by a single library, to monthly programs conducted across the entire system.

=== Kids ===
The system offers 1,000 Books Before Kindergarten, a program to encourage parents to read their children the titular number of books before the beginning of kindergarten. This is in an attempt to help develop language skills for the child.

Another program is the Summer Reading Challenge, a program aimed to stop the "summer slide" of reading that occurs when kids aren't required to read. The program rewards readers with unique tags for a bracelet.

Battle of the Books is a program that takes place during the school year. It has levels for both elementary and middle school. Students read several books, and subsequently are asked questions about the book's content. The elementary level must read seven books, and the middle school level must read five.

=== Teens ===
Teens have a wide variety of activities within the library. Most of these come in the form of volunteering, although there are some non-volunteering activities conducted by individual branches.

The Teen Advisory Group (TAG) allows teens to contribute to discussions of what activities the library should do for teens. Meetings are mandatory from September to May, and they are optional during the summertime.

Reading Buddies is a program that takes in early-mid July. Teens are paired up with a K-3 reader, who they then have to read books to over the course of a four-week period. The goal is to "foster a love of reading and confidence" in the child.

Teens are also able to volunteer in the above mentioned Summer Reading Challenge.

=== Adults ===
Several adult activities are held throughout the library system. The library offers programs and classes, in partnership with Tidewater Community College, to help adults develop their education. This includes Career Online High School, a program to help adults who graduated eighth grade to obtain their high school diploma.

VBPL also offers career coaching and assistance to help adults with their time in the workforce. This includes business and investment opportunities with small businesses in the city.

The Edgar T. Brown Local History Archive, named after a collector of Virginia Beach history, allows adults to look through genealogy records and other archives. It is located on the ground floor of the Meyera E. Oberndorf Central Library.

== Additional Resources ==
Virginia Beach Public Library offers many services to the public other than books and programs. Most library branches have public computer access and printing services. Among regular printers, a select few branches offer 3D printing. For those who need a quiet place to study or those in need of meeting spaces, VBPL offers reservable study rooms and meeting rooms. Many library branches also offer notary services.

VBPL offers a Seed Library at their Central, Bayside, Kempsville, Oceanfront, and Princess Anne branches; residents are able to take home various seeds from the library to plant.

Along with traditional library materials such as books, DVDs, and audiobooks, the library also allows library card users to check out various materials from their Library of Things collection. Within the Library of Things, patrons can borrow gadgets such as coding robots, GoPros, and telescopes.

=== Accessible Resources ===
VBPL offers many resources and services to residents who have disabilities. The library partners with the National Library Service for the Blind and Print Disabled to provide books in more accessible formats, such as audiobooks and audiobook players, large print books, and braille materials.

For residents that are homebound, the library offers a delivery service for qualified individuals.
