= Meyera Oberndorf =

American politician

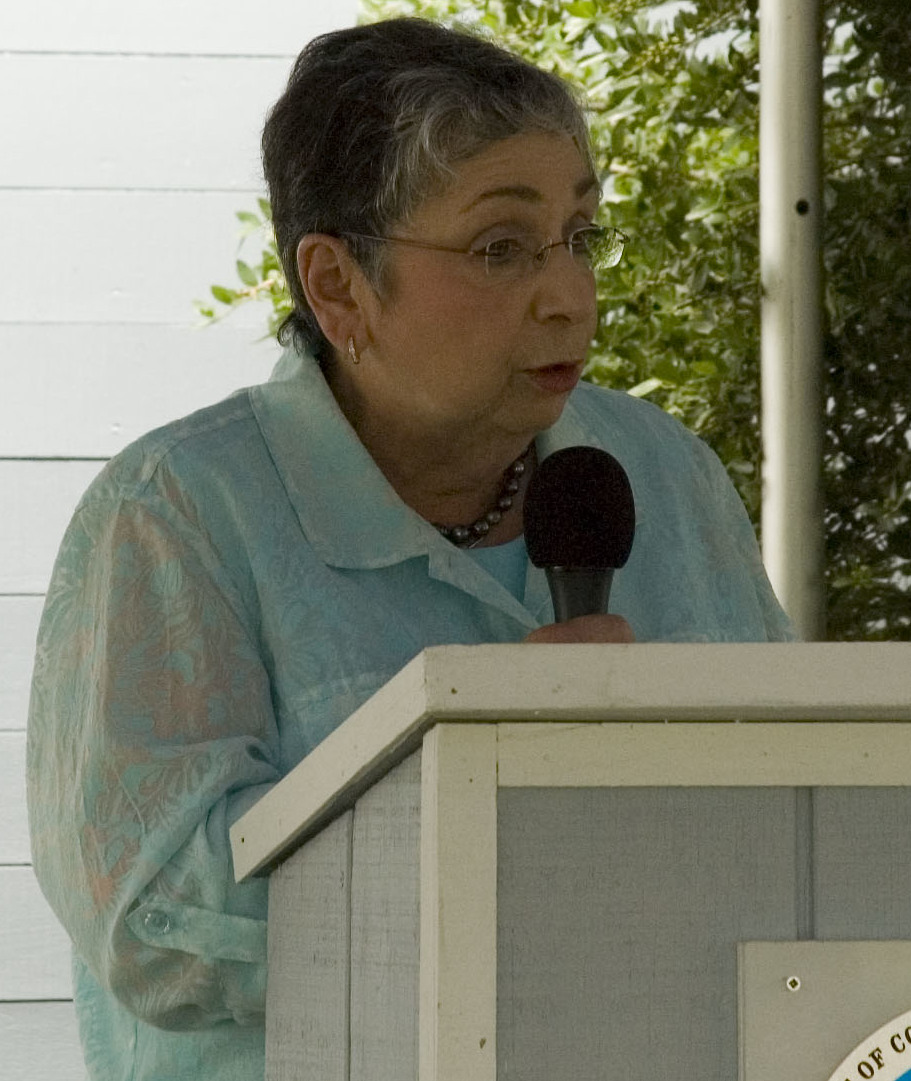

23rd Mayor of Virginia Beach
- In office July 1, 1988 – December 31, 2008
- Preceded by: Robert G. Jones
- Succeeded by: Will Sessoms

Vice Mayor of Virginia Beach
- In office July 1, 1986 – June 30, 1988
- Preceded by: Reba McClanan
- Succeeded by: Robert Fentress

Member of the Virginia Beach City Council, At Large
- In office July 1, 1976 – June 30, 1988
- Succeeded by: Will Sessoms

Member, Virginia Beach Public Library Board
- In office 1966 – June 30, 1976

Personal details
- Born: February 10, 1941 Newport News, Virginia, U.S.
- Died: March 13, 2015 (aged 74) Charlotte, North Carolina, U.S.
- Party: Democratic
- Spouse: Roger Oberndorf
- Education: Old Dominion University (BA)
- Profession: Public servant

Meyera E. Oberndorf (February 10, 1941 – March 13, 2015) was the 23rd Mayor of Virginia Beach, Virginia. She was Virginia Beach's longest-serving mayor, and she previously served as the city's vice mayor. She was the city's first female mayor and was the first woman elected to public office in the more than 300-year history of Virginia Beach or its predecessor, Princess Anne County.

== Life and career ==
Though she was Virginia Beach's first directly elected mayor, her role was primarily to serve as the chair during City Council meetings, of which she had been a member since 1976, and to officiate at a wide array of ceremonial functions. This is because Virginia Beach has a council-manager form of government. Virginia Beach is the largest populated city in the Commonwealth of Virginia.

In 1989, prior to an annual end of the summer event sponsored by African American college students, Oberndorf announced that the event had grown too large to handle and was not welcome in the city. Combined with city officials denying use of public facilities for the event and new ordinances which led to the arrests and citations of hundreds of attendees for mostly minor offenses such as jay-walking and loud music, Oberndorf's statement heightened racial tensions which exploded with the "Greekfest" riots in which over 100 beachfront stores were damaged. Despite her claim that NAACP assertions of poor racial relations between the city and African Americans were "poppycock," city actions in 1989 and in the years following so damaged race relations that it wasn't until two decades later, at the tail end of Obendorf's long-time mayoralty, that Virginia Beach again began to have success drawing large numbers of African Americans to the resort beachfront.

In April 2007, Oberndorf was criticized by Fox News Channel commentator Bill O'Reilly. O'Reilly claimed she mishandled a situation involving illegal immigrant Alfredo Ramos, who was accused and later convicted of causing a fatal drunk driving crash on March 30, 2007. O'Reilly said that Virginia Beach should have reported Ramos to Immigration and Customs Enforcement once they realized he was in the country illegally, since he had prior alcohol-related convictions, including DUI and public drunkenness. However, Virginia Beach didn't learn of the immigrant's status until after the crash.

On November 5, 2008, Oberndorf was defeated by Will Sessoms, ending her two decade run as mayor. On December 10, 2008, before her term expired, the city council unanimously voted to rename the city's Central Library the Meyera E. Oberndorf Central Library.

On March 4, 2013, the Diocese of Richmond and Catholic Charities of Eastern Virginia presented Oberndorf with the Bishop's Humanitarian Award for her public service. She was posthumously named one of the Virginia Women in History for 2016.

== Subsequent career ==
After leaving her position as mayor, Oberndorf appeared in a series of commercials for ABNB Federal Credit Union in 2009. Governor Tim Kaine appointed her to the Virginia State Library Board in 2009 and she served there until resigning in December 2012.

== Personal life ==
Oberndorf's husband, Roger, died from complications of a brain injury in October 2012. Following her husband's death, she was diagnosed with Alzheimer's disease. She was also a breast cancer survivor and had two daughters. Oberndorf died at 11 a.m. on Friday, March 13, 2015, at the age of 74. She was Jewish.

Political offices
Preceded by Robert G. Jones	Mayor of Virginia Beach, Virginia; 1988 - 2008	Succeeded by William D. Sessoms, Jr.
Preceded by Reba McClanan	Vice Mayor of Virginia Beach, Virginia; 1986 - 1988	Succeeded by Robert Fentress
