= Skylar Johnston =

American softball player (born 1998)

Personal information
- Born: February 18, 1998 (age 28) Norfolk, Virginia, U.S.
- Height: 5 ft 6 in (1.68 m)

Sport
- Country: USA
- Sport: Softball
- College team: NC State Wolfpack; Fordham Rams

Skylar Anne Johnston (born February 18, 1998) is an American softball player. She attended First Colonial High School in Virginia Beach, Virginia. She later attended Fordham University for two years, before transferring to North Carolina State University. At both universities, she played on the school's respective college softball teams. While playing at Fordham, Johnston led the Rams to back-to-back Atlantic 10 Conference championships and NCAA tournament appearances in 2017 and 2018.
