= Alanton =

- Neighborhood
- Location within the Commonwealth of Virginia Alanton (the United States)
- Coordinates: 36°52′58″N 76°1′19″W
- Country: United States
- State: Virginia
- Independent city: Virginia Beach
- Time zone: UTC−5 (Eastern (EST))
  - Summer (DST): UTC−4 (EDT)

Alanton is an older, upscale, residential neighborhood in the northern part of Virginia Beach, Virginia, United States. The community was named for Alan McCullough, a prominent Virginia architect, but developed by his father. It is bordered by Baycliff and Cape Henry Collegiate School. Alanton Elementary is located within Alanton. Lynnhaven Middle School and First Colonial High School are the schools zoned for Alanton.

== History ==
Alan McCullough and his family purchased a piece of land in the early 1920s. The architect and his family lived in one of only three houses there at the time. Louisa Venable Kyle was one of the first residents to move to Alanton and lived on Woodhouse Road.
