= Mayor of Virginia Beach =

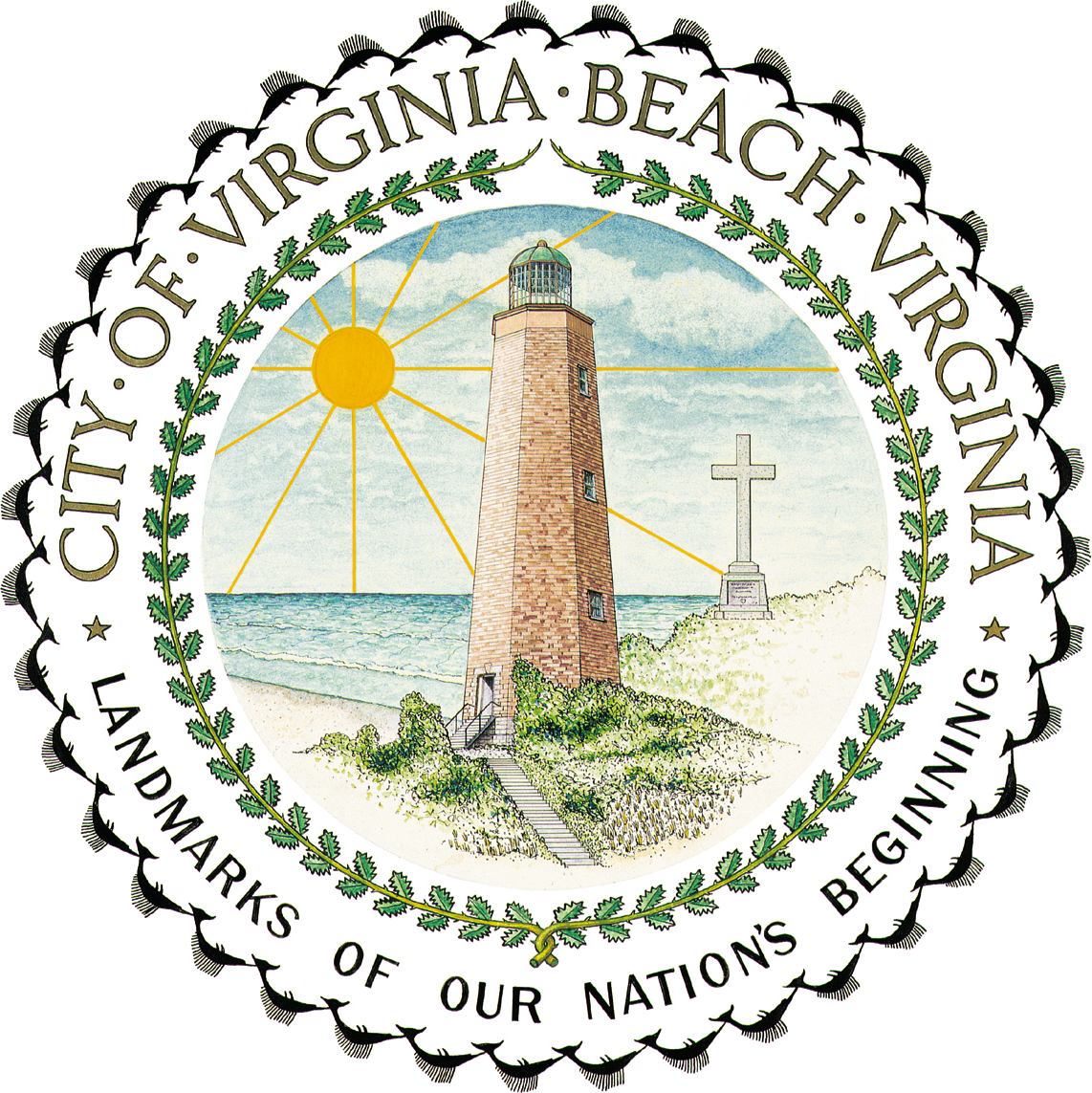
- Seal of Virginia Beach

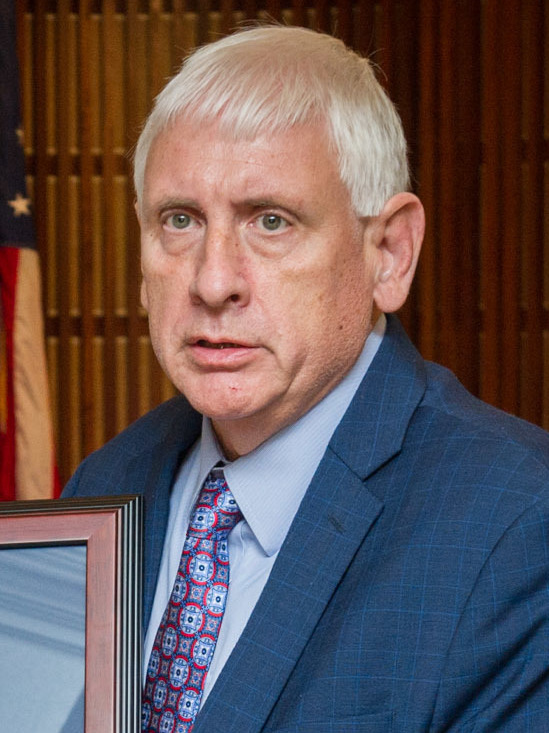
- Incumbent; Bobby Dyer since November 20, 2018
- Seat: Virginia Beach Municipal Center
- Term length: Two years (1906-1988); Four years (1988-present)
- Formation: March 19, 1906
- First holder: B.P. Holland
- Website: www.vbgov.com/government/departments/city-clerk/mayor/

The Mayor of Virginia Beach is the head of the municipal government in Virginia Beach, Virginia, which has a council-manager system of government. The mayor presides over city council meetings and serves as the ceremonial head and spokesperson of the city. The mayor is elected to a four-year term through direct election and the office has no term limits. These elections are nonpartisan, as are all municipal elections in Virginia Beach. Prior to 1988, the mayor was appointed from among city council members elected to represent the city's various boroughs. The mayor's office is located within the City Clerk's office in the Virginia Beach Municipal Center.

The current mayor is Bobby Dyer. The longest serving mayor of Virginia Beach was Meyera Oberndorf who served for over 20 years from 1988 to 2008, until she was defeated for reelection by Will Sessoms. Dyer was elected in a special election in 2018 to fill the remainder of Will Sessoms's term following his resignation. Dyer was re-elected in 2020 running against former Virginia Secretary of Finance Jody Wagner.

== Electoral history ==
=== 1988 general election ===
Starting with the fall 1988 election, the city's mayor was chosen directly by voters. Previously, the mayor was appointed from among city council members elected to represent the city's various boroughs. In that election, Meyera Oberndorf became the city's first female mayor and first to be directly elected.

=== Sessoms' 2014-15 conflict of interest case ===
On November 8, 2014, The Virginian-Pilot published an investigative article wherein it examined how Mayor Will Sessoms had voted dozens of times with the City Council on matters directly benefiting developers who borrowed at least $140 million from TowneBank where Sessoms was still employed as a president. The votes violated Sessoms' pledge not to allow his responsibilities to the bank conflict with his public duties and were speculated to also possibly violate state law. The votes taken by Sessoms were reported to have occurred from the beginning of his first term in January 2009 up until as recently as October 2014. The next day, city councilman John Moss publicly called on local, state, or federal law enforcement officers to investigate whether Sessoms broke the law by repeatedly voting on issues affecting clients of TowneBank while continuing to serve as that company's president.

On November 12, 2014, Sessoms issues a public statement on the allegations saying, "I have been made aware of the recent stories and am taking this situation and these allegations seriously. What has been best for Virginia Beach has always been a priority for me. I would never intentionally put Virginia Beach's or TowneBank's integrity in jeopardy. I plan to do a thorough review of these allegations, but it's going to take time to sort through the various votes since I've been Mayor. Until I have the opportunity to do that, I'm sure you can understand that I cannot offer any additional comments at this time." The following day, it was announced that Commonwealth's Attorney Colin Stolle was recusing himself from the potential investigation into the Pilot's report and that he was requesting the Circuit Court to appoint a special prosecutor to investigate the matter. Stolle cited probable conflicts of interest including the fact that his brother, Virginia Beach Sheriff Ken Stolle, was on the board of TowneBank and that his wife worked at a bank branch for four years. On November 14, 2014, Mayor Paul Fraim of Norfolk and Mayor Linda Johnson of Suffolk announced that they were resigning from their positions as directors of TowneBank so as to eliminate the perception of a conflict of interest. By the following day, Sessoms had given notice his intention to forfeit his seats on TowneBank's corporate Board of Directors, its Virginia Beach community board, and its Financial Services board. Sessoms had earlier that week had his position as president of the bank's Financial Services division suspended with pay. On November 18, 2014, Sessoms returned to his first city council meeting since the Pilot's report during which he twice abstained from votes connected TowneBank. The next day, Commonwealth's Attorney Michael R. Doucette of Lynchburg, Virginia was appointed as special prosecutor and Sessoms hired a team of criminal defense attorneys. On December 24, 2014, Sessoms announced his resignation from his position as president following TowneBank's policy change prohibiting senior bank management from holding any elective office.

On November 4, 2015, Sessoms was charged with five misdemeanor counts of violating the state's Conflict of Interest Act for votes he cast that benefited borrowers of TowneBank. A trial date was tentatively set for December 7, 2015. On December 3, 2015, it was reported that the trial had been delayed to December 28 as none of the General District Court judges in Virginia Beach would hear the case citing the potential for conflict of interest as Sessoms was still mayor. On December 28, 2015, Sessoms pleaded no contest to a single misdemeanor charge of violating the state's Conflict of Interest Act. As part of a plea agreement offered by the special prosecutor, the four other charges he faced were dropped.

=== 2016 general election ===
On February 22, 2016, Will Sessoms announced he was running for re-election for a third term as mayor. He claimed to have spent months deliberating over the decision following his recent conflict of interest conviction and that he made up his mind after receiving support from the majority of the city council. On June 2, 2016, it was reported that Richard "RK" Kowalewitch would be challenging Sessoms a second time for the mayor's office. Kowalewitch cited Sessoms' recent conviction as an issue of concern in his announcement. Following the filing deadline on June 14, 2015, it was reported that former city councilman Don Weeks and George Furman III were also challenging Sessoms.

On October 29, 2016, The Virginian-Pilot reported the results of a poll conducted by Christopher Newport University that they had produced in connection with WVEC earlier that month. In the poll, 43 percent of 706 likely voters said they favored Sessoms with closest challenger Weeks receiving 11 percent support. On November 8, 2016, Sessoms was elected to a third term.

=== 2018 special election ===
On April 18, 2018, Will Sessoms announced he was resigning as mayor of Virginia Beach after serving less than a year and a half of his third term. A day later, city council member Bobby Dyer announced his intention to run for the office. On May 1, 2018, it was announced that the Virginia Beach City Council had decided in 9–0 decision to appoint former mayor Louis R. Jones as interim mayor until a special election could be held on November 6, 2018. A day later, city council member M. Ben Davenport announced his intention to run for the office. On November 6, 2018, Dyer defeated Davenport and became the most recent mayor of Virginia Beach.

=== 2020 general election ===
On February 27, 2020, city council member Aaron Rouse announced his intention to seek the office. When reached by The Virginian-Pilot for comment on the announcement, Bobby Dyer confirmed that he would be seeking re-election. On May 30, 2020, Rouse announced that he was dropping out of the race citing the coronavirus pandemic as the reason for ending his campaign. On June 9, 2020, former Virginia Secretary of Finance Jody Wagner announced that she would challenge Dyer in the upcoming election. On June 12, 2020, businessman Richard W. "RK" Kowalewitch announced that he would also challenge Dyer.

=== 2024 general election ===
Bobby Dyer won re-election by a substantial margin in the 2024 election.

== List ==
Denotes service as acting mayor before appointment or after resignation

#	Mayor	Term start	Term end	Party (Officially nonpartisan)
1	B.P. Holland	March 19, 1906	August 1, 1908	
2	Emerson Land	September 1, 1908	August 30, 1910	
3	W.J. Wright	September 6, 1910	January 21, 1913	
4	B.P. Holland	January 21, 1913	July 31, 1916	
5	Charles E. Barco	August 1, 1916	June 21, 1920	
6	Herman Drinkwater	July 7, 1920	August 30, 1924	
7	W.R. Ashburn	September 1, 1924	August 27, 1928	
8	Roy Smith	September 4, 1934	September 1, 1940	
9	W.W. Elliot	September 1, 1940	October 14, 1946	
10	H.W. Leeke	October 14, 1946	June 28, 1948	
11	W.F. Patton	July 12, 1948	April 3, 1952	
12	P.F. Murray	April 3, 1952	August 24, 1954	
13	Frank A. Dusch	September 1, 1954	September 1, 1970	
14	Donald H. Rhodes	September 8, 1970	June 30, 1972	
15	Robert B. Cromwell, Jr.	July 1, 1972	June 30, 1974	
16	J. Curtis Payne	July 1, 1974	June 30, 1976	
17	Clarence A. Holland	July 1, 1976	June 30, 1978	Democratic
18	Patrick L. Standing	July 1, 1978	June 30, 1980	
19	J. Henry McCoy, Jr.	July 1, 1980	June 30, 1982	
20	Louis R. Jones	July 1, 1982	June 30, 1984	Republican
21	Harold Heischober	July 1, 1984	June 30, 1986	Republican
22	Robert G. Jones	July 1, 1986	June 30, 1988	Democratic
23	Meyera Oberndorf	July 1, 1988	December 31, 2008	Democratic
24	Will Sessoms	January 1, 2009	April 30, 2018	Republican
–	Louis R. Jones; Acting	May 1, 2018	November 19, 2018	Republican
25	Bobby Dyer	November 20, 2018	Incumbent	Republican

== See also ==
- Mayoral elections in Virginia Beach, Virginia
