= Will Sessoms =

American politician

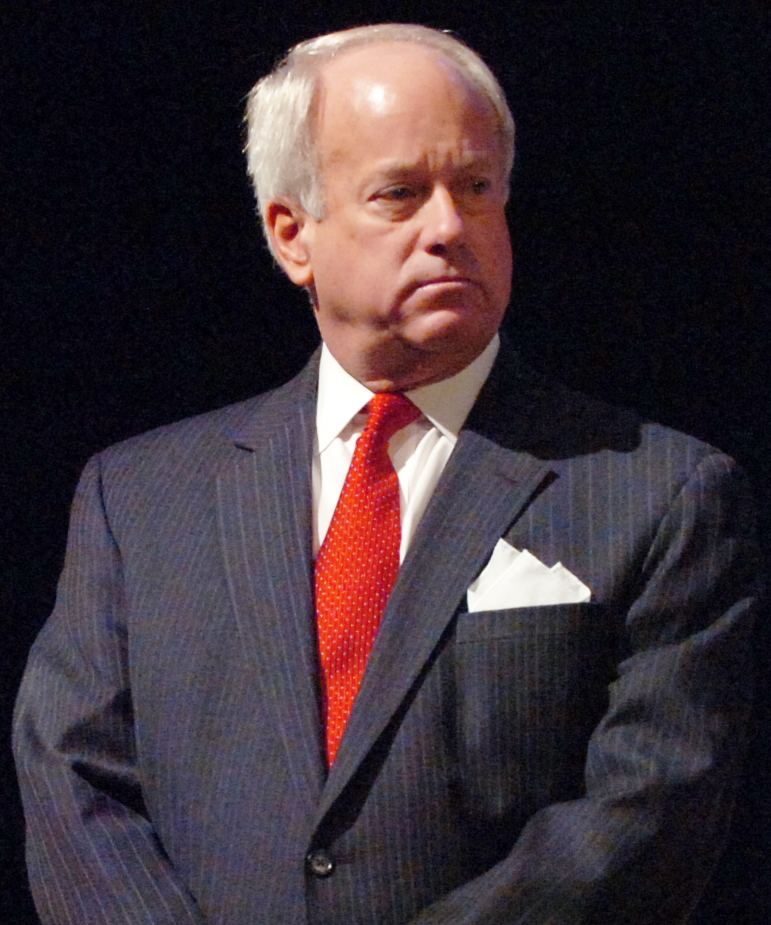

24th Mayor of Virginia Beach
- In office January 1, 2009 – April 30, 2018
- Preceded by: Meyera Oberndorf
- Succeeded by: Bobby Dyer

Vice Mayor of Virginia Beach
- In office July 1, 1992 – June 30, 2002
- Preceded by: Robert Fentress
- Succeeded by: Robert C. Mandigo Jr.

Member of the Virginia Beach City Council, At Large
- In office July 1, 1988 – June 30, 2002
- Succeeded by: Ron Villanueva / Peter W. Schmidt

Personal details
- Born: c. 1954 (age 71–72)
- Party: Republican
- Education: Virginia Commonwealth University (BBA)
- Occupation: Politician, Bank Officer
- Website: Mayor website

William Douglas Sessoms Jr. (born c. 1954) is an American politician and bank officer who served as the mayor of Virginia Beach, Virginia from 2008 until his resignation in April, 2018. He was president and CEO of Towne Financial Services Group, a division of TowneBank of Hampton Roads, Virginia from 2011 to 2014.

Sessoms was previously councilman (1988–2002) and vice mayor of Virginia Beach (1992–2002). He declined to run for re-election in 2002. Sessoms was previously a president and director of the Virginia Beach region at TowneBank (2005–2011).

== Career ==
=== City Council ===
In 1988, he was elected to an at-large seat on the Virginia Beach City Council in a special election. He had been a member of the Virginia Beach Rescue Squad and a banker with Central Fidelity. In 1990, he ran in the May 1 election to retain his at-large seat on the city council. He and fellow at-large incumbent Nancy K. Parker won re-election over nine challengers despite public displeasure regarding Labor Day weekend riots the previous year.

On July 2, 1992, he was elected Vice Mayor by a 7–4 vote of the city council. While in office, he remained a senior vice president in commercial loans at Central Fidelity National Bank. During his 1994 re-election, he was found to own stock in Philip Morris and have voted against an increase in the cigarette tax, the major source of funding for an economic development incentive fund. He was supported by both Republican and Democratic officials. He was re-elected on May 3, 1994, and he received the most votes of city council candidates. He considered contesting Meyera Oberndorf for Mayor in 1996, stayed in office and was appointed to a third two-year term as Vice Mayor in 1996. At the time of his 1998 election, he was a banker for Wachovia. He won re-election on May 5, 1998. Citing family reasons and job pressures, Sessoms declined to run for re-election in 2002.

In 1997, when Virginia Beach struck a deal with the PGA Tour to build a $10 million championship golf course, Sessoms was one of the city's spokespersons. The tour agreed to pay $6.5 million of the construction cost.

=== Mayor ===
Sessoms announced his mayoral candidacy on June 25, 2008, and was endorsed by Doug McCain, who is a Virginia Beach resident and John McCain's son. By December 31, 2007, Sessoms had a US$321,000 to $5,600 fundraising edge. Sessoms' highest previous office was Vice Mayor of Virginia Beach, but at the time of his election he was serving as the president of TowneBank Virginia Beach. Sessoms defeated five-term incumbent Meyera Oberndorf on November 4, 2008. Previous municipal elections had taken place in May. Oberndorf had been mayor since 1988, when the office was decided by direct election for the first time. Sessoms was sworn in on January 5, 2009, with the agenda to create jobs, improve the environment and neighborhoods, purchase Norfolk Southern Railway right-of-way to build a light-rail line, and address problems with youth gangs. Mayor Sessoms announced a campaign for a third term in February 2016 and launched his campaign on August 26, 2016. The election was held November 8, 2016. He was reelected to a third term. Sessoms announced his resignation from his office as Mayor of Virginia Beach, effective April 30, 2018.

=== 2014 conflict of interest case ===
On November 9, 2014, The Virginian-Pilot reported that Sessoms had "voted dozens of times with the City Council on matters directly benefiting developers who borrowed at least $140 million from the bank. The votes violate Sessoms' promise not to let his duties to the bank conflict with his public obligations, and some may also violate state law." John Holland, writing for the newspaper, said "a review of some 3,000 court, land and council records showed a pattern of such votes spanning his nearly six years in office." Subsequently, Virginia Beach councilman John Moss said "what the newspaper reported makes a prima facie case against the mayor, and that isn't going to just go away," adding "law enforcement officials must investigate whether Mayor Will Sessoms broke the law."

On November 11, 2014, on returning from an international trip, Sessoms issued a statement saying "I have been made aware of the recent stories and am taking this situation and these allegations seriously." Sessoms was subsequently suspended (with pay) by the bank, pending an investigation. On the following day, the City of Virginia Beach Commonwealth's Attorney asked for a special prosecutor investigation if Sessoms broke laws by casting council votes in favor of bank clients. The mayors of the neighboring cities of Norfolk and Suffolk, Paul D. Fraim and Linda Johnson, resigned their directorships at TowneBank on November 13, to "eliminate any perception of a conflict of interest and is not suggestive that any conflict exists." A day later, Sessoms resigned his positions on TowneBank boards. On December 24, 2014, Sessoms resigned from TowneBank, in accordance with a new policy prohibiting senior bank management from holding elective office.

On November 4, 2015, Sessoms was charged with five misdemeanor counts of violating the state's Conflict of Interest Act for votes he cast that benefited borrowers of TowneBank. A trial date was tentatively set for December 7, 2015. On December 3, 2015, it was reported that the trial had been delayed to December 28 as none of the General District Court judges in Virginia Beach would hear the case citing the potential for conflict of interest as Sessoms was still mayor. On December 28, 2015, Sessoms pleaded no contest to a single misdemeanor charge of violating the state's Conflict of Interest Act. As part of a plea agreement offered by the special prosecutor, the four other charges he faced were dropped.

== Personal life ==
Married to his wife Beverley since 1977, the Sessoms have three children, Mollie S. Korte, Kate S. Napolitano, and Anne Douglas Gangwer. His father-in-law is Roy B. Martin Jr., former mayor of Norfolk, Virginia.

Sessoms earned a Bachelor of Business Administration from Virginia Commonwealth University. Until September 1988, he was a member of the board of directors of the Princess Anne Country Club, which was at the time an integration target by the National Association for the Advancement of Colored People. Early in his political career his membership in the allegedly discriminatory country club and his children's attendance at the private Norfolk Academy were deemed elitist by his political opponents.

Political offices
Preceded by Meyera Oberndorf	Mayor of Virginia Beach, Virginia; 2009 - 2018	Succeeded by Robert M. "Bobby" Dyer
