= Virginia Beach City Council =

Legislative body of Virginia Beach, Virginia

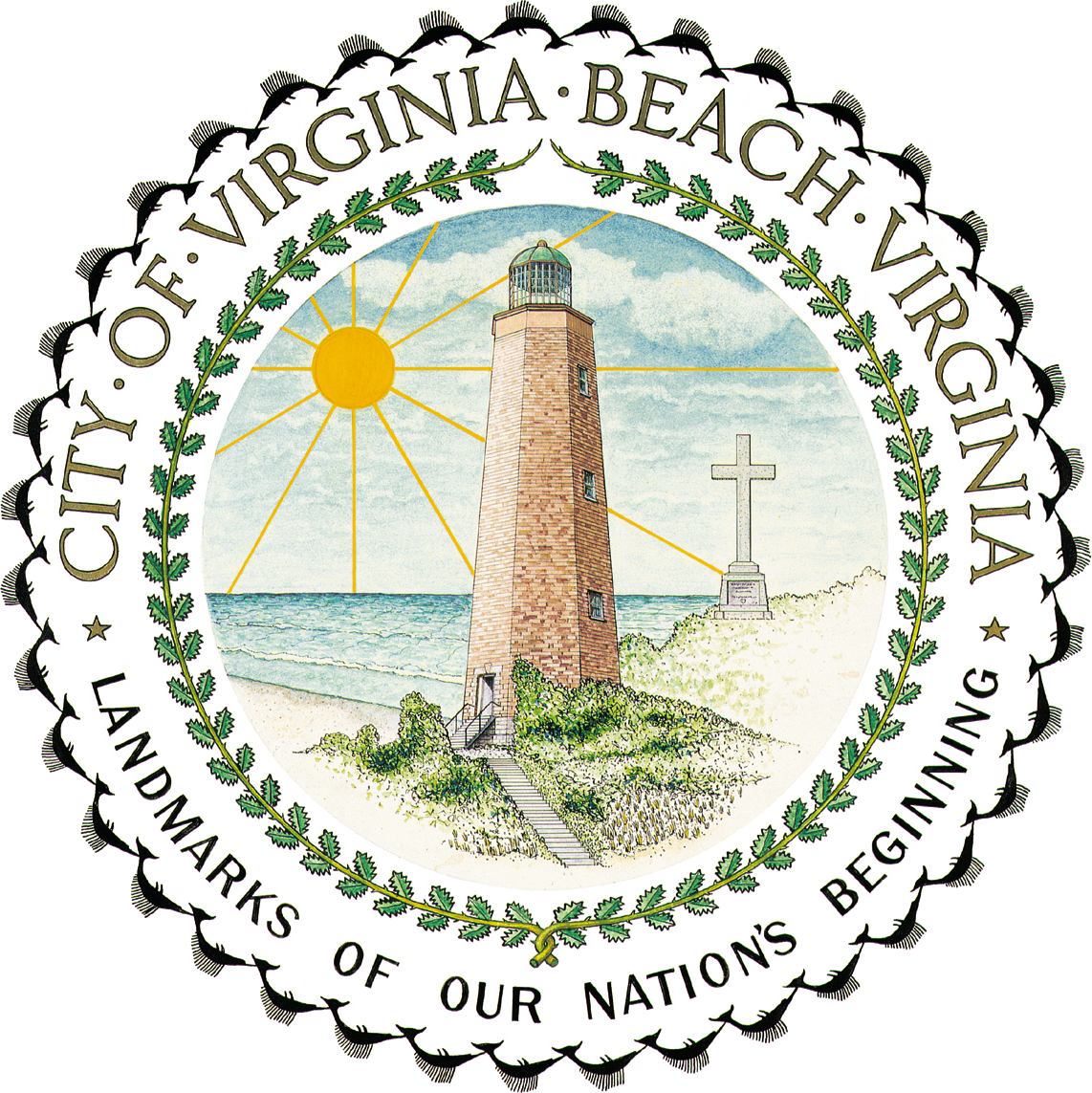

Type
- Type: Unicameral

History
- Founded: January 1, 1963

Leadership
- Mayor: Bobby Dyer, Republican since November 20, 2018

Structure
- Seats: 11
- Political groups: Officially nonpartisan: Republican (5); Democratic (6)
- Length of term: 4 Years

Elections
- Voting system: Single-member districts
- Last general election: November 5, 2024
- Next general election: November 3, 2026

Meeting place
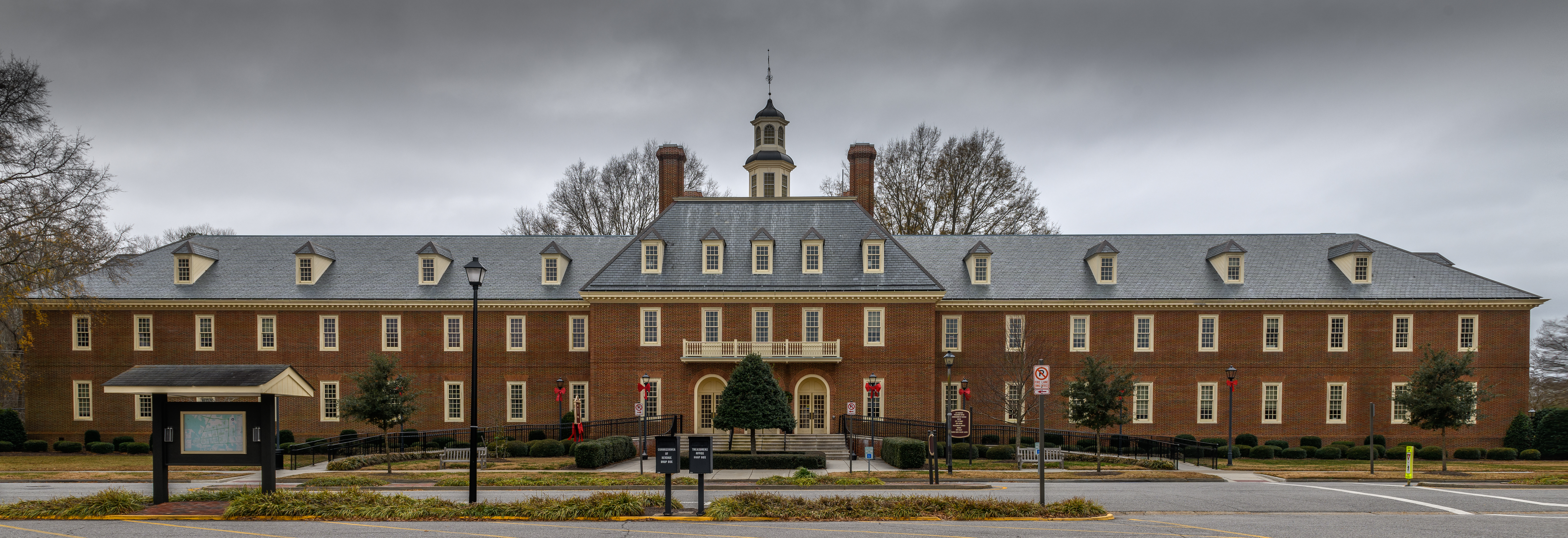
- Virginia Beach City Hall; Virginia Beach Municipal Center; Virginia Beach, VA

Website
- https://www.vbgov.com/government/departments/city-clerk/city-council/

Constitution
- Charter of Virginia Beach

The Virginia Beach City Council is the legislative branch that governs the City of Virginia Beach and its more than 450,000 citizens. It has 11 members that serve four-year terms and are elected on a staggered basis. General elections are held the Tuesday following the first Monday in November in even-numbered years. All registered voters are eligible to vote for all members of City Council. Three Council Members and the Mayor serve "At Large" with no district residency requirement. All other Council Members are required to live in the districts they represent: Bayside, Beach, Centerville, Kempsville, Lynnhaven, Princess Anne, and Rose Hall. The Council holds regular meetings on alternate Tuesday evenings on the second floor of the Virginia Beach City Hall.

== History ==
=== Direct election of Mayor, 1988 ===
Starting with the fall 1988 election, the city's mayor was chosen directly by voters. Previously, the mayor was appointed from among city council members elected to represent the city's various boroughs. In that election, Meyera Oberndorf became the city's first female mayor and first to be directly elected.

=== Election at large from districts, 1998 ===
In 1998, Virginia Beach abolished its system of boroughs from which seven council members were elected and formed in their place seven new districts including Centerville, Kempsville, Rose Hall, Bayside, Lynnhaven, Beach, and Princess Anne. Candidates were required to be residents of the districts for which they ran, but all voting was at-large.

=== Elimination of at-large elections for districts: Holloway vs. City of Virginia Beach, 2020-22 ===
On October 6, 2020, a trial began in federal court in Virginia Beach between residents Latasha Holloway and Georgia Allen and the City of Virginia Beach. Filing their lawsuit in 2017, the residents alleged that the city's process for electing members to the city council violated the 1965 Voting Rights Act. The lawsuit claimed that the system unlawfully diluted minority voting strength and denied minorities an equal opportunity to elect candidates of their choice. That same day, the city council cancelled their regular meeting after council member John Moss tested positive for COVID-19. Two days later, it was announced that, due to the ongoing pandemic, council meetings would now be held at the Virginia Beach Convention Center.

In 2021, Virginia passed HB 2198, which prohibits local governments from using at-large voting for district elections.

Later in 2021, the trial court found that the city's at-large voting system violates Section 2 of the Voting Rights Act by diluting the voting strength of the Black, Asian and Hispanic minority groups, and ordered that the city adopt a different voting system.

The city worked with a special master, who developed a 10 district ward system, plus one at-large contest for Mayor, late in 2021. Ward candidates would be elected only by voters in the ward. The court ordered the adoption of that system.

In 2022, the United States Court of Appeals for the Fourth Circuit held in a 2-1 opinion that because HB 2198 had already prevented the city from conducting any future City Council elections under the electoral system that Plaintiffs challenged, that the case was moot, and overturned the district court's ruling. The timing was such that the 10-ward system would still be used in 2022. In the future, it could be modified, but would have to meet both the requirements of both HB 2198, and the Voting Rights Act of Virginia, which prohibits at large election systems if those systems impair the ability of minority groups to either elect candidates of their choice or to influence the outcome of an election.

== Current council ==
District	Councilmember	Took office	Party (Officially nonpartisan)
At Large (Mayor)	Bobby Dyer (Mayor)	2018	Republican
1	David Hutcheson	2024	Democratic
2	Barbara Henley	2007	Democratic
3	Michael Berlucchi	2019	Republican
4	Amelia Ross-Hammond	2023	Democratic
5	Rosemary Wilson (Vice Mayor)	2001	Republican
6	Worth Remick	2023	Democratic
7	Cal "Cash" Jackson-Green	2025	Republican
8	Stacy Cummings	2025	Republican
9	Joash Schulman	2023	Democratic
10	Jennifer Rouse	2023	Democratic

== Past councils ==
=== 1963-1998 ===
Year	District										
Year	At Large (Mayor)	At Large (A)	At Large (B1)	At Large (B2)	1 Bayside	2 Blackwater	3 Kempsville	4 Lynnhaven	5 Princess Anne	6 Pungo	7 Virginia Beach
1963	Mayors chosen internally from among council members				Lawrence E. Marshall	James E. Snyder	Swindell Pollock	James E. Darden	S. Paul Brown	Kenneth N. Whitehurst	W. H. Kitchin, Jr.
1964	Mayors chosen internally from among council members				Lawrence E. Marshall	Earl M. Tebault	Swindell Pollock	James E. Darden	S. Paul Brown	Kenneth N. Whitehurst	W. H. Kitchin, Jr.
1965	Mayors chosen internally from among council members				Lawrence E. Marshall	Earl M. Tebault	A. L. Bonney	James E. Darden	S. Paul Brown	Kenneth N. Whitehurst	W. H. Kitchin, Jr.
1966	Mayors chosen internally from among council members				Lawrence E. Marshall	Earl M. Tebault	A. L. Bonney	G. Dewey Simmons, Jr.	S. Paul Brown	Kenneth N. Whitehurst	
1967	Mayors chosen internally from among council members				Lawrence E. Marshall	Earl M. Tebault	A. L. Bonney	G. Dewey Simmons, Jr.	J. Curtis Payne	Kenneth N. Whitehurst	
1968	Mayors chosen internally from among council members				Lawrence E. Marshall	Earl M. Tebault	A. L. Bonney	G. Dewey Simmons, Jr.	J. Curtis Payne	Kenneth N. Whitehurst	
1969	Mayors chosen internally from among council members				Lawrence E. Marshall	Earl M. Tebault	A. L. Bonney	G. Dewey Simmons, Jr.		Kenneth N. Whitehurst	
1970	Mayors chosen internally from among council members				Clarence A. Holland	Earl M. Tebault	Donald H. Rhodes	F. Reid Ervin		Floyd E. Waterfield, Jr.	
1971	Mayors chosen internally from among council members				Clarence A. Holland	Earl M. Tebault	Donald H. Rhodes	F. Reid Ervin		Floyd E. Waterfield, Jr.	Robert H. Callis, Jr.
1972	Mayors chosen internally from among council members				Clarence A. Holland	John A. Baum	Donald H. Rhodes	F. Reid Ervin		Floyd E. Waterfield, Jr.	Robert H. Callis, Jr.
1973	Mayors chosen internally from among council members				Clarence A. Holland	John A. Baum	Donald H. Rhodes	F. Reid Ervin		Floyd E. Waterfield, Jr.	Robert H. Callis, Jr.
1974	Mayors chosen internally from among council members				Clarence A. Holland	John A. Baum	J. Henry McCoy, Jr.	John R. Griffin		Floyd E. Waterfield, Jr.	Robert H. Callis, Jr.
1975	Mayors chosen internally from among council members				Clarence A. Holland	John A. Baum	J. Henry McCoy, Jr.	John R. Griffin		Floyd E. Waterfield, Jr.	Robert H. Callis, Jr.
1976	Mayors chosen internally from among council members				Clarence A. Holland	John A. Baum	J. Henry McCoy, Jr.	John R. Griffin		Floyd E. Waterfield, Jr.	Roger L. Riggs
1977	Mayors chosen internally from among council members				Clarence A. Holland	John A. Baum	J. Henry McCoy, Jr.	John R. Griffin		Floyd E. Waterfield, Jr.	Roger L. Riggs
1978	Mayors chosen internally from among council members				Clarence A. Holland	John A. Baum	J. Henry McCoy, Jr.	Donald W. Merrick	J. Curtis Payne	Barbara M. Henley	Roger L. Riggs
1979	Mayors chosen internally from among council members				Clarence A. Holland	John A. Baum	J. Henry McCoy, Jr.	Donald W. Merrick	J. Curtis Payne	Barbara M. Henley	Roger L. Riggs
1980	Mayors chosen internally from among council members				Clarence A. Holland	John A. Baum	J. Henry McCoy, Jr.	Donald W. Merrick	Reba S. McClanan	Barbara M. Henley	W. H. Kitchin, III
1981	Mayors chosen internally from among council members				Clarence A. Holland	John A. Baum	J. Henry McCoy, Jr.	Donald W. Merrick	Reba S. McClanan	Barbara M. Henley	W. H. Kitchin, III
1982	Mayors chosen internally from among council members				Louis R. Jones	John A. Baum	J. Henry McCoy, Jr.	H. Jack Jennings	Reba S. McClanan	Barbara M. Henley	W. H. Kitchin, III
1983	Mayors chosen internally from among council members				Louis R. Jones	John A. Baum	J. Henry McCoy, Jr.	H. Jack Jennings	Reba S. McClanan	Barbara M. Henley	W. H. Kitchin, III
1984	Mayors chosen internally from among council members				Louis R. Jones	John A. Baum	J. Henry McCoy, Jr.	H. Jack Jennings	Reba S. McClanan	Barbara M. Henley	Robert E. Fentress
1985	Mayors chosen internally from among council members				Louis R. Jones	John A. Baum	J. Henry McCoy, Jr.	H. Jack Jennings	Reba S. McClanan	Barbara M. Henley	Robert E. Fentress
1986	Mayors chosen internally from among council members				Louis R. Jones	John A. Baum	John Moss	Albert W. Balko	Reba S. McClanan	Barbara M. Henley	Robert E. Fentress
1987	Mayors chosen internally from among council members				Louis R. Jones	John A. Baum	John Moss	Albert W. Balko	Reba S. McClanan	Barbara M. Henley	Robert E. Fentress
1988	Meyera Oberndorf				Louis R. Jones	John A. Baum	John Moss	Albert W. Balko	Reba S. McClanan	Barbara M. Henley	Robert E. Fentress
1989	Meyera Oberndorf				Louis R. Jones	John A. Baum	John Moss	Albert W. Balko	Reba S. McClanan	Barbara M. Henley	Robert E. Fentress
1990	Meyera Oberndorf				Louis R. Jones	John A. Baum	Robert W. Clyburn	James W. Brazier, Jr.	Reba S. McClanan	Paul J. Lanteigne	Robert E. Fentress
1991	Meyera Oberndorf				Louis R. Jones	John A. Baum	Robert W. Clyburn	James W. Brazier, Jr.	Reba S. McClanan	Paul J. Lanteigne	Robert E. Fentress
1992	Meyera Oberndorf				Louis R. Jones	John A. Baum	Robert W. Clyburn	James W. Brazier, Jr.	Robert K. Dean	Paul J. Lanteigne	Linwood O. Branch, III
1993	Meyera Oberndorf				Louis R. Jones	John A. Baum	Robert W. Clyburn	James W. Brazier, Jr.	Robert K. Dean	Paul J. Lanteigne	Linwood O. Branch, III
1994	Meyera Oberndorf				Louis R. Jones	John A. Baum	Louisa M. Strayhorn	W. W. Harrison, Jr.	Robert K. Dean	Barbara M. Henley	Linwood O. Branch, III
1995	Meyera Oberndorf				Louis R. Jones	John A. Baum	Louisa M. Strayhorn	W. W. Harrison, Jr.	Robert K. Dean	Barbara M. Henley	Linwood O. Branch, III
1996	Meyera Oberndorf				Louis R. Jones	John A. Baum	Louisa M. Strayhorn	W. W. Harrison, Jr.	Reba S. McClanan	Barbara M. Henley	Linwood O. Branch, III
1997	Meyera Oberndorf				Louis R. Jones	John A. Baum	Louisa M. Strayhorn	W. W. Harrison, Jr.	Reba S. McClanan	Barbara M. Henley	Linwood O. Branch, III
1998	Meyera Oberndorf				Louis R. Jones	John A. Baum	Louisa M. Strayhorn	W. W. Harrison, Jr.	Reba S. McClanan	Barbara M. Henley	Linwood O. Branch, III
Year	At Large (Mayor)	At Large (A)	At Large (B1)	At Large (B2)	1 Bayside	2 Blackwater	3 Kempsville	4 Lynnhaven	5 Princess Anne	6 Pungo	7 Virginia Beach
Year	District										

=== 1998-2022 ===
Year	District										
Year	At Large (Mayor)	At Large (A)	At Large (B1)	At Large (B2)	1 Centerville	2 Kempsville	3 Rose Hall	4 Bayside	5 Lynnhaven	6 Beach	7 Princess Anne
1998	Meyera Oberndorf	Harold Heischober	Will Sessoms		Margaret L. Eure	A. M. "Don" Weeks	Reba S. McClanan	Louis R. Jones	W. W. Harrison, Jr.	Linwood O. Branch, III	Barbara M. Henley
1999	Meyera Oberndorf	Harold Heischober	Will Sessoms		Margaret L. Eure	A. M. "Don" Weeks	Reba S. McClanan	Louis R. Jones	W. W. Harrison, Jr.	Linwood O. Branch, III	Barbara M. Henley
2000	Meyera Oberndorf	John A. Baum	Will Sessoms		Margaret L. Eure	Robert C. Mandigo, Jr.	Reba S. McClanan	Louis R. Jones	W. W. Harrison, Jr.	Linwood O. Branch, III	Barbara M. Henley
2001	Meyera Oberndorf	Rosemary Wilson	Will Sessoms		Margaret L. Eure	Robert C. Mandigo, Jr.	Reba S. McClanan	Louis R. Jones	W. W. Harrison, Jr.	Linwood O. Branch, III	Barbara M. Henley
2002	Meyera Oberndorf	Rosemary Wilson	Ron Villanueva	Peter W. Schmidt	Margaret L. Eure	Robert C. Mandigo, Jr.	Reba S. McClanan	Louis R. Jones	James L. Wood	Richard A. Maddox	Jim Reeve
2003	Meyera Oberndorf	Rosemary Wilson	Ron Villanueva	Peter W. Schmidt	Margaret L. Eure	Harry E. Diezel	Reba S. McClanan	Louis R. Jones	James L. Wood	Richard A. Maddox	Jim Reeve
2004	Meyera Oberndorf	Rosemary Wilson	Ron Villanueva	Peter W. Schmidt	Bobby Dyer	Harry E. Diezel	Reba S. McClanan	Louis R. Jones	James L. Wood	Richard A. Maddox	Jim Reeve
2005	Meyera Oberndorf	Rosemary Wilson	Ron Villanueva	Peter W. Schmidt	Bobby Dyer	Harry E. Diezel	Reba S. McClanan	Louis R. Jones	James L. Wood	Richard A. Maddox	Jim Reeve
2006	Meyera Oberndorf	Rosemary Wilson	Ron Villanueva	Bill DeSteph	Bobby Dyer	Harry E. Diezel	Reba S. McClanan	Louis R. Jones	James L. Wood	John E. Uhrin	Barbara M. Henley
2007	Meyera Oberndorf	Rosemary Wilson	Ron Villanueva	Bill DeSteph	Bobby Dyer	Harry E. Diezel	Reba S. McClanan	Louis R. Jones	James L. Wood	John E. Uhrin	Barbara M. Henley
2008	Meyera Oberndorf	Rosemary Wilson	Ron Villanueva	Bill DeSteph	Bobby Dyer	Harry E. Diezel	Reba S. McClanan	Louis R. Jones	James L. Wood	John E. Uhrin	Barbara M. Henley
2009	Will Sessoms	Rosemary Wilson	Ron Villanueva	Bill DeSteph	Bobby Dyer	Harry E. Diezel	Glenn Davis	Louis R. Jones	James L. Wood	John E. Uhrin	Barbara M. Henley
2010	Will Sessoms	Rosemary Wilson	Rita Sweet Bellitto	Bill DeSteph	Bobby Dyer	Harry E. Diezel	Glenn Davis	Louis R. Jones	James L. Wood	John E. Uhrin	Barbara M. Henley
2011	Will Sessoms	Rosemary Wilson	Prescott Sherrod	Bill DeSteph	Bobby Dyer	Harry E. Diezel	Glenn Davis	Louis R. Jones	James L. Wood	John E. Uhrin	Barbara M. Henley
2012	Will Sessoms	Rosemary Wilson	John Moss	Bill DeSteph	Bobby Dyer	Harry E. Diezel	Glenn Davis	Louis R. Jones	James L. Wood	John E. Uhrin	Barbara M. Henley
2013	Will Sessoms	Rosemary Wilson	John Moss	Bill DeSteph	Bobby Dyer	Amelia N. Ross-Hammond	Glenn Davis	Louis R. Jones	James L. Wood	John E. Uhrin	Barbara M. Henley
2014	Will Sessoms	Rosemary Wilson	John Moss	Brad Martin	Bobby Dyer	Amelia N. Ross-Hammond	Shannon Kane	Louis R. Jones	James L. Wood	John E. Uhrin	Barbara M. Henley
2015	Will Sessoms	Rosemary Wilson	John Moss	M. Ben Davenport	Bobby Dyer	Amelia N. Ross-Hammond	Shannon Kane	Louis R. Jones	James L. Wood	John E. Uhrin	Barbara M. Henley
2016	Will Sessoms	Rosemary Wilson	John Moss	M. Ben Davenport	Bobby Dyer	Amelia N. Ross-Hammond	Shannon Kane	Louis R. Jones	James L. Wood	John E. Uhrin	Barbara M. Henley
2017	Will Sessoms	Rosemary Wilson	John Moss	M. Ben Davenport	Bobby Dyer	Jessica P. Abbott	Shannon Kane	Louis R. Jones	James L. Wood	John E. Uhrin	Barbara M. Henley
2018	Bobby Dyer	Rosemary Wilson	John Moss	M. Ben Davenport	Sabrina Wooten	Jessica P. Abbott	Shannon Kane	Louis R. Jones	James L. Wood	John E. Uhrin	Barbara M. Henley
2019	Bobby Dyer	Rosemary Wilson	John Moss	Aaron Rouse	Sabrina Wooten	Jessica P. Abbott	Michael Berlucchi	Louis R. Jones	James L. Wood	David Nygaard	Barbara M. Henley
2020	Bobby Dyer	Rosemary Wilson	John Moss	Aaron Rouse	Sabrina Wooten	Jessica P. Abbott	Michael Berlucchi	Louis R. Jones	James L. Wood	Guy Tower	Barbara M. Henley
2021	Bobby Dyer	Rosemary Wilson	John Moss	Aaron Rouse	Sabrina Wooten	Rocky Holcomb	Michael Berlucchi	Louis R. Jones	Linwood O. Branch, III	Guy Tower	Barbara M. Henley
2022	Bobby Dyer	Rosemary Wilson	John Moss	Aaron Rouse	Sabrina Wooten	Rocky Holcomb	Michael Berlucchi	Delceno Miles	Linwood O. Branch, III	Guy Tower	Barbara M. Henley
Year	At Large (Mayor)	At Large (A)	At Large (B1)	At Large (B2)	1 Centerville	2 Kempsville	3 Rose Hall	4 Bayside	5 Lynnhaven	6 Beach	7 Princess Anne
Year	District										

=== 2023-Present ===
Year	District										
Year	At Large (Mayor)	1	2	3	4	5	6	7	8	9	10
2023	Bobby Dyer	Rocky Holcomb	Barbara M. Henley	Michael Berlucchi	Amelia N. Ross-Hammond	Rosemary Wilson	Worth Remick	Sabrina Wooten	Chris Taylor	Joash Schulman	Jennifer Rouse
2024	Bobby Dyer	David Hutcheson	Barbara M. Henley	Michael Berlucchi	Amelia N. Ross-Hammond	Rosemary Wilson	Worth Remick	Sabrina Wooten	Chris Taylor	Joash Schulman	Jennifer Rouse
2025	Bobby Dyer	David Hutcheson	Barbara M. Henley	Michael Berlucchi	Amelia N. Ross-Hammond	Rosemary Wilson	Worth Remick	Cash Jackson-Green	Stacy Cummings	Joash Schulman	Jennifer Rouse

== Election results ==
=== 2020 general election ===
2020 Virginia Beach City Council Election, At-Large (A)
Party	Candidate	Votes	%
Nonpartisan	Rosemary A. Wilson (Note: This candidate is affiliated with the Republican Party)	108,723	53.89
Nonpartisan	Brandon C. Hutchins (Note: This candidate is affiliated with the Democratic Party)	71,577	35.47
Nonpartisan	Nadine Marie Paniccia (Note: This candidate is not affiliated with any party)	20,820	10.32
	Write-in	649	0.32
Total votes		201,769	100

2020 Virginia Beach City Council Election, Centerville District
Party	Candidate	Votes	%
Nonpartisan	Sabrina D. Wooten	102,645	44.90
Nonpartisan	Eric V. Wray, II	84,098	54.81
	Write-in	542	0.29
Total votes		187,285	100

2020 Virginia Beach City Council Election, Kempsville District
Party	Candidate	Votes	%
Nonpartisan	Jessica P. Abbott (Note: This candidate is affiliated with the Libertarian Party)	116,971	62.38
Nonpartisan	William J. "Bill" Dale	70,030	37.35
	Write-in	498	0.27
Total votes		187,499	100

2020 Virginia Beach City Council Election, Rose Hall District
Party	Candidate	Votes	%
Nonpartisan	Michael F. Berlucchi	106,091	57.53
Nonpartisan	C. Conrad Schesventer II	50,986	27.65
Nonpartisan	Garry B. Hubbard	26,578	14.41
	Write-in	752	0.41
Total votes		184,407	100
