= Aaron Rouse =

American politician and football player (born 1984)

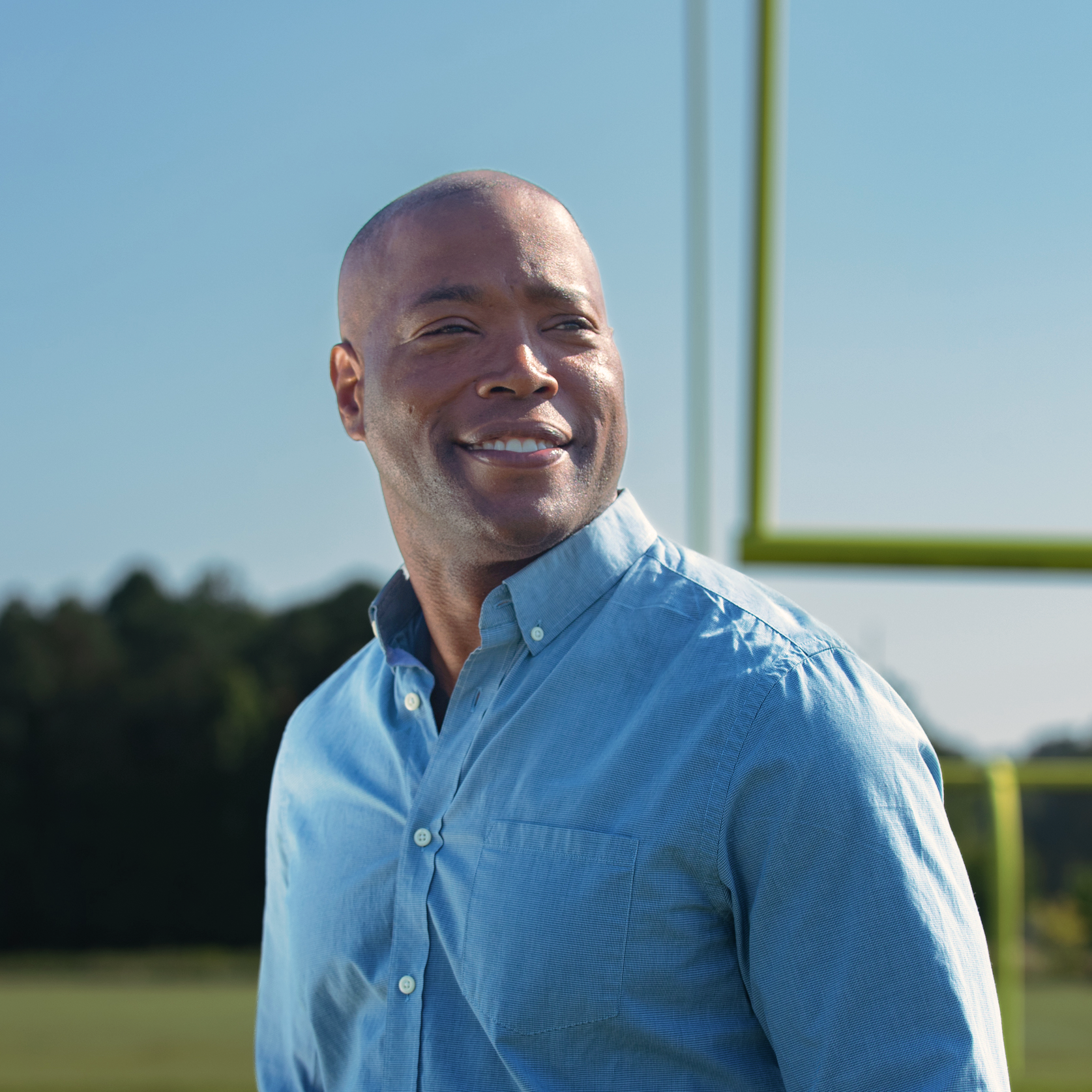
- Rouse at First Colonial High School, Virginia Beach

Member of the Virginia Senate
- Incumbent
- Assumed office January 18, 2023
- Preceded by: Jen Kiggans
- Constituency: 7th district (2023–2024); 22nd district (2024–present)

Member of the Virginia Beach City Council from the at-large district
- In office January 1, 2019 – December 31, 2022
- Preceded by: Ben Davenport
- Succeeded by: Jennifer Rouse

Personal details
- Born: Aaron Roosevelt Rouse; January 8, 1984 (age 42) Virginia Beach, Virginia, U.S.
- Party: Democratic
- Spouse: Jennifer
- Education: Virginia Tech (BS)
- Website: Campaign website
- Football career

No. 37, 26
- Position: Safety

Personal information
- Listed height: 6 ft 4 in (1.93 m)
- Listed weight: 223 lb (101 kg)

Career information
- High school: First Colonial (Virginia Beach)
- College: Virginia Tech
- NFL draft: 2007: 3rd round, 89th overall pick

Career history
- Green Bay Packers (2007–2009); New York Giants (2009); Arizona Cardinals (2010)*; Omaha Nighthawks (2010); Virginia Destroyers (2011–2012)
- * Offseason or practice squad member only

Awards and highlights
- UFL champion (2011); UFL championship game MVP (2011); First-team All-ACC (2005); Freshman All-American (2003)

Career NFL statistics
- Total tackles: 143
- Sacks: 1
- Pass deflections: 11
- Interceptions: 4
- Defensive touchdowns: 1
- Stats at Pro Football Reference

Aaron Roosevelt Rouse (born January 8, 1984) is an American politician and former professional football player. A member of the Democratic Party, Rouse represents the 22nd district in the Senate of Virginia. He previously served on the Virginia Beach City Council. Rouse played as a safety in the National Football League (NFL) and United Football League (UFL).

Rouse played college football for the Virginia Tech Hokies before he was selected by the Green Bay Packers in the third round of the 2007 NFL draft. Rouse was also a member of the New York Giants and Arizona Cardinals of the NFL and the Omaha Nighthawks and Virginia Destroyers of the UFL.

From 2019 to 2022, Rouse represented an at-large seat on the Virginia Beach city council, having been elected in 2018. He won a special election to fill the open seat for Virginia's 7th Senate district in January 2023.

== Early life ==
Rouse attended First Colonial High School in Virginia where he excelled at many positions, including outside linebacker and wide receiver. He was named first-team Group AAA by the Associated Press and second-team by the state coaches as a linebacker. In his senior year, he was named Defensive Player of the Year in the Virginia Beach District, yet lost the state award to Kai Parham, who also played in the Beach District. He also lettered in basketball.

== College career ==
Rouse redshirted his freshman year. At the backup 'Field' outside linebacker position, he finished the season with 46 total tackles (19 solo tackles) with three tackles for losses, one forced fumble and two pass deflections. He was selected to the Freshman All-American team by Rivals.com while appearing in 13 games and starting only one.

During his sophomore season, Rouse remained at his backup position at outside linebacker. He finished the season with 37 total tackles (16 solo tackles) with 2.5 tackles for losses and one forced fumble. At the end of the season, Rouse switched from weak outside linebacker to the defensive backfield at safety.

Rouse had an outstanding junior season in 2005 opening at the 'Rover' safety position, collecting 77 total tackles and five interceptions, which prompted him to be named a First-team All-Atlantic Coast Conference selection and one of the top safeties in the country. He was the leader of the Virginia Tech defense and elected to stay in college for his senior season. He had a reputation of hard hits, sometimes resulting in penalties.

During the 2006 season, his senior season, Rouse did not perform at the same level; Rouse had an extremely poor performance in the game against Georgia Tech which landed him on the bench before the end of the game. He had another disappointing performance the next week against Boston College which led to him splitting time at the safety position with fellow senior safety, Carey Wade, for a three-week stretch four games before the end of the season. He returned to the starting spot for the final four games of the season, having started ten total games for the season. Rouse finished his senior season with 57 total tackles, one forced fumble, two pass deflections and two interceptions.

Rouse finished his college career at Virginia Tech with 217 total tackles (93 solo tackles), 12 tackles for losses, four forced fumbles with one recovery, nine passes defensed and five interceptions. Rouse made 24 starts in 52 career games at Virginia Tech.

== Professional career ==
=== Pre-draft ===
Pre-draft measurables
| Height | Weight | Arm length | Hand span | 40-yard dash | 10-yard split | 20-yard split | 20-yard shuttle | Three-cone drill | Vertical jump | Broad jump | Bench press |
|---|---|---|---|---|---|---|---|---|---|---|---|
| 6 ft 4 in (1.93 m) | 223 lb (101 kg) | 34 3/4 in (0.88 m) | 9 3/8 in (0.24 m) | 4.53 s | 1.53 s | 2.60 s | 4.19 s | 6.81 s | 35.0 in (0.89 m) | 10 ft 1 in (3.07 m) | 16 reps |
All values from NFL Combine/Pro Day

Rouse entered the 2007 NFL draft as one of the top prospects at safety with his unusual combination of size, strength and speed. At 6'4, 223 pounds, he ran 4.59 40-yard dash at the NFL Combine. While his physical attributes impressed scouts, his lackluster senior season drastically reduced his draft stock; Rouse was projected by many as a late first-round to second-round draft pick.

=== Green Bay Packers ===
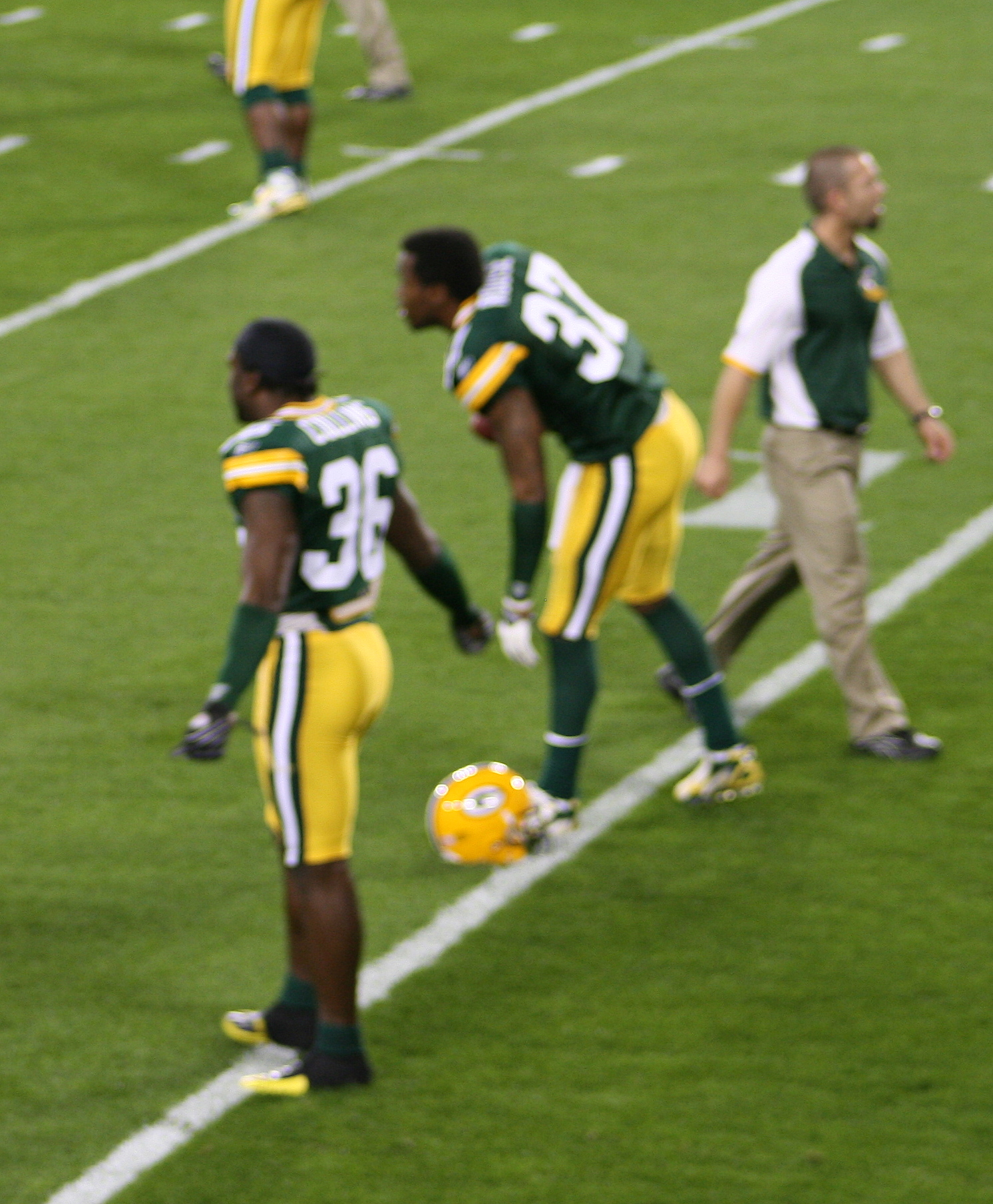
Rouse (middle) with the Green Bay Packers in 2007

The Green Bay Packers selected Rouse in the third round (89th overall) of the 2007 NFL draft. On June 8, he signed a four-year, $2.3 million contract with the Packers.

After an injury to starting safety Nick Collins, Rouse made his first NFL start on November 11, during a 34–0 victory over the Minnesota Vikings. On November 18, Rouse recorded his first interception, when he picked off a Vinny Testaverde pass on Carolina Panthers' opening possession in a 31–17 victory over the Panthers. The following week, in a 37–26 win over the Detroit Lions, Rouse recorded his second career interception in just his second career start. He was nominated for the week 12 Diet Pepsi Rookie of the Week award for his performance against the Detroit Lions where he made a key game-changing interception against fellow rookie Calvin Johnson. He finished his rookie campaign with 25 total tackles (22 solo tackles, two assists), four pass deflections and two interceptions while playing in 11 total games, starting in three of them. Rouse helped Green Bay win the 2007 NFC North division championship. The Packers finished the season losing to the New York Giants 23–20 in the NFC championship game, missing out on going to Super Bowl XLII.

Rouse entered the 2008 season as the backup strong safety behind starter Atari Bigby but an injury to Bigby during the Week 2 matchup at Detroit promoted Rouse to starting strong safety for the Packers' third game of the season against the Dallas Cowboys and the fourth against the Tampa Bay Buccaneers. After sustaining a knee injury in the 4th quarter against Tampa Bay, Rouse was inactive for the Packers' next contest against the Atlanta Falcons. With Bigby also still out with an injury, Rouse was reinserted into the starting line up for the next two games against the Seattle Seahawks and the Indianapolis Colts. Against the Colts, Rouse had seven tackles, two pass defenses, and an interception which he returned 99 yards for a touchdown, tying the longest interception return in Packers history. He was named NFL Defensive player of the week for that performance. After Atari Bigby returned from injury, Rouse returned to his backup role for the next couple of games until he was injured after his interception in the Monday Night Football game at New Orleans. Rouse was inactive for the next contest vs Carolina.

Rouse again entered the season as a backup but started in Week 2 against the Cincinnati Bengals in place of the injured Atari Bigby. He recorded 9 tackles, 2 assisted, in the game. Rouse was cut by the Packers the following Wednesday, on September 23, 2009, and replaced by Matt Giordano.

=== Later career ===
Rouse was claimed off waivers by the New York Giants on September 24, 2009, after Kenny Phillips was placed on injured reserve. He was released on March 6, 2010.

Rouse signed with the Arizona Cardinals on August 3, 2010. He was waived on August 18.

After being released by the Cardinals, Rouse signed with the Omaha Nighthawks of the United Football League (UFL) for the 2010 season. Rouse continued with the UFL for the 2011 season, joining the Virginia Destroyers for the 2011 season. A highlight of Rouse's time with the Destroyers was the 2011 UFL championship game, in which Rouse recorded three interceptions en route to a 17–3 win; Rouse was designated the game MVP.

== Political career ==
In 2018, Rouse ran for an at-large seat on the Virginia Beach City Council. There were six candidates running for two seats. Rouse got the most votes and was elected alongside incumbent councilman John Moss.

On February 27, 2020, Rouse announced he would run for mayor in the November election, facing incumbent Bobby Dyer. On May 30, 2020, he announced that he was dropping out of the race citing the coronavirus pandemic as the reason for ending his campaign. On March 14, 2022, Rouse announced he would be running for the Virginia State Senate in newly formed District 22 in the 2023 election. He was succeeded on the city council by his wife Jennifer Rouse, a community college instructor.

After Jen Kiggans was elected to the U.S. House of Representatives, Rouse became a candidate to succeed her in Virginia's 7th Senate district in the January 2023 special election. Rouse, a Democrat, narrowly defeated Republican Kevin H. Adams on January 10, 2023, to become the district's senator-elect, flipping the seat.

In 2024, he announced his bid for the 2025 Virginia lieutenant gubernatorial election. He lost the primary and came in third place, losing to Ghazala Hashmi.

=== Fundraising ===
Candidate fundraising as of January 4, 2023
| Adams Raised | 989.7k |
| Adams Spent | 852.8k |
| Rouse Raised | 977.8k |
| Rouse Spent | 899.5k |

Due to the state-wide dynamics in Virginia, the special election also drew in lots of outside spending, including $100,000 from Planned Parenthood of Virginia on behalf of Rouse.

== Electoral history ==
2023 Virginia Senate special election, District 7
| Party | Candidate | Votes | % |
|---|---|---|---|
| Democratic | Aaron Rouse | 19,784 | 50.7 |
| Republican | Kevin Adams | 19,187 | 49.2 |
| Write-in | | 34 | 0.1 |
| Total votes | | 39,005 | 100 |
| Democratic gain from Republican | | | |

Results by county and independent city: Hashmi: 20–30%; 30–40%; 40–50%; 50–60%; Stoney: 20–30%; 30–40%; 40–50%; 50–60%; 60–70%; 70–80%; Rouse: 20–30%; 30–40%; 40–50%; 50–60%; 60–70%; Lateef: 30–40%; Bastani: 30–40%; Tie: 20–30%

2025 Virginia Lt. Governor Democratic primary
| Party | Candidate | Votes | % |
|---|---|---|---|
| Democratic | Ghazala Hashmi | 131,865 | 27.39% |
| Democratic | Levar Stoney | 128,262 | 26.64% |
| Democratic | Aaron Rouse | 126,802 | 26.34% |
| Democratic | Babur Lateef | 40,447 | 8.40% |
| Democratic | Alex Bastani | 27,386 | 5.69% |
| Democratic | Victor Salgado | 26,682 | 5.54% |
| Total votes | | 481,444 | 100.00% |
