= Norview High School =

Location
- 6501 Chesapeake Boulevard; Norfolk, Virginia 23513; United States; 36°54′0.5″N 76°14′25.1″W

Information
- School type: Public, high school
- Founded: 1922
- School district: Norfolk City Public Schools
- Superintendent: Sharon Byrdsong
- Principal: Tori Jacobs-Sumbry
- Teaching staff: 118.45 (FTE) (2021–22)
- Grades: 9–12
- Enrollment: 1,889 (2021–22)
- Student to teacher ratio: 15.95 (2021–22)
- Language: English
- Campus: Suburban
- Colors: Royal blue and white
- Athletics conference: Virginia High School League; AAA Eastern Region; Eastern District
- Mascot: Pilot
- Rival: Granby High School; Lake Taylor High School
- Communities served: Colonial Heights; Greenhill Farms; Tanners Creek
- Feeder schools: Academy of International Studies at Rosemont; Crossroads School; Norview Middle School
- Website: Official site

Norview High School is a public high school in central Norfolk, Virginia, United States. It is one of the five local high schools that serve the city in the Norfolk Public Schools system.

== About ==
On February 2, 1959, Norview High School admitted its first African American students to attend the previously all-white school. These students were a part of the Norfolk 17, who were first to integrate schools in Virginia.

Norview High School is home of the Dodson Scholars Program and the Leadership Center for Science and Engineering program.

== Notable alumni ==
- Kaytron Allen (Class of 2022 - transferred), football player for the Penn State Nittany Lions
- Leroy R. Hassell Sr. (Class of 1973), former chief justice of Virginia
- Daun Hester (Class of 1973), former member of the Virginia House of Delegates
- Keyontae Johnson (Class of 2018 - transferred), basketball player for the Charlotte Hornets
- David Martin (Class of 1997), football player who played for the Tennessee Volunteers, Green Bay Packers, Miami Dolphins, and Buffalo Bills
- Beverly Middleton (Class of 1946), former member of the Virginia House of Delegates
- Jodi Rell (Class of 1964), governor of Connecticut 2004–2010
- Desmond Ricks (Class of 2023 - transferred), football player for the Texas A&M Aggies
- Donovan Rose (Class of 1975), football player who played in the CFL and for the Kansas City Chiefs and Miami Dolphins
- Deborah Shelton (Class of 1966), Miss USA 1970; actress who starred on Dallas
- James Whitley (Class of 1997), football player who played in the CFL, AFL, and for the St. Louis Rams, Green Bay Packers, and Carolina Panthers
- Alan Williams (Class of 1987), former defensive coordinator for the Minnesota Vikings and Chicago Bears
- Willie Young (Class of 1992), basketball player and coach who played professionally in The Netherlands and Germany

=== Notable faculty ===
- Bob Tata, former football coach for Norview 1967–1979, former member of the Virginia House of Delegates
- Bob Thalman, former track coach at Norview, former VMI Keydets football coach
