= Granby =

Granby may refer to:

== Places ==
=== Canada ===
- Port Granby, Ontario
- Granby, Quebec
  - Granby (electoral district), a Quebec electoral district whose territory is identical to that of the city
  - Challenger de Granby, a tennis tournament

=== United States ===
- Granby, Colorado
- Granby, Connecticut
- Granby, Massachusetts, a New England town
  - Granby (CDP), Massachusetts, the main village in the town
- Granby, Missouri
- Granby, New York
- Granby, South Carolina
- Granby, Vermont
- Granby Street, a historic commercial corridor in Norfolk, Virginia
- Granby Township (disambiguation)

=== Elsewhere ===
- Granby crater, a meteor crater in Sweden
- Granby Four Streets, an area of Toxteth, Liverpool
- Granby, Nottinghamshire, England

== Schools ==
- Granby High School, Norfolk, Virginia
- Granby Memorial High School, Granby, Connecticut
- Granby Junior Senior High School, Granby, Massachusetts

== Other ==
- 2004 Granby, Colorado, bulldozer rampage
- The Marquess of Granby (see Duke of Rutland)
- Operation Granby, the UK codename for its military operation in the Gulf War
- John Manners, Marquess of Granby, the British commander at the Battle of Minden
- Granby (novel), by Thomas Henry Lister, published in 1826
- Granby Consolidated Mining, Smelting and Power Company, Limited a Canadian mining and smelting company
- Granby roll, an amateur wrestling technique
- Granby Runestone located in Sweden
- Granby (typeface), a font family by Stephenson Blake
- Granby station, a train station in Granby, Colorado
