= Eastern District (VHSL) =

Virginia High School League district

The Eastern District is a district of the Virginia High School League. The schools in the Eastern District compete in the 6A, 5A, and 4A divisions.

The members of the Eastern District are all the public schools in Norfolk City and Portsmouth City.

== Member schools ==
- Churchland High School of Portsmouth, Virginia
- Granby High School of Norfolk, Virginia
- Lake Taylor High School of Norfolk, Virginia
- Manor High School of Portsmouth, Virginia
- Maury High School of Norfolk, Virginia
- I.C. Norcom High School of Portsmouth, Virginia
- Norview High School of Norfolk, Virginia
- Booker T. Washington High School of Norfolk, Virginia.
