= Booker T. Washington High School (Virginia) =

Coordinates: 36°51′12.1″N 76°15′59.6″W

Location
- 1111 Park Avenue; Norfolk, Virginia 23504; United States

Information
- School type: Public, high school
- Founded: 1911
- Founder: Winston Douglas, Booker T. Washington
- School district: Norfolk Public Schools
- Superintendent: Sharon I. Byrdsong
- Principal: Diron T. Ford
- Staff: 73.00 (2023-24)(FTE)
- Grades: 9–12
- Enrollment: 955 (2023–24)
- Student to teacher ratio: 13.08 (2023-24)
- Language: English
- Campus: City
- Colors: Maroon, white and gold
- Athletics conference: Virginia High School League; Class 3 Region A Eastern District
- Mascot: The Mighty Bookers
- Rival: I. C. Norcom High School, Lake Taylor High School
- Feeder schools: William H. Ruffner Academy; Lake Taylor Middle School
- Website: btw.npsk12.com

Booker T. Washington High School, also known as Booker T, BTW, or the Academy of Visual and Performing Arts, is a public high school located in Norfolk, Virginia. It is administered by Norfolk Public Schools system. The school colors are maroon, white and gold. The school is called “The Mighty Booker T” and the “Fighting Bookers" in Norfolk, Virginia.

== History ==
Booker T. Washington High School was named in honor of Booker T. Washington who was an African-American educator, author, orator, and adviser to presidents of the United States. In April 1911, when the Norfolk School Board agreed to allow one year of high school at the site of John T. West Elementary School. For each of the next three years, a grade was added culminating in the State Board of Educations approval. Thus Washington became Virginia first accredited public high school for African-Americans.

In 1915 the high school was moved to Princess Anne Road, where Norfolk Mission College had been located and adopted the name Booker T. Washington High School. In 1917, Booker T. Washington High School became Virginia’s first accredited public high school for African Americans. A new building opened on Virginia Beach Boulevard in 1924. There were 1,750 students in grades 7–12 and 63 teachers. The school became known as The Mighty Booker T, and the athletic teams were nicknamed The Fighting Bookers.

In 1974, the school moved into a new facility on Park Avenue, which was built for $8 million and has remained there ever since. The school marching band, the Marching Bookers was the first African-American Marching Band to perform in a televised presidential inauguration parade, when they performed for President Harry Truman in 1949. The band also performed in both of President Eisenhower's inauguration parades. They also performed in the 2014 Virginia governor inauguration parade.

== Alma mater ==
Composed by: Phyllis Hoggard and Wanza Sutton Class of 1960

== Notable alumni ==
- Michael Basnight, NFL player
- Aline Elizabeth Black, educator
- Tony Brothers, NBA referee
- Don Carey, cornerback, Norfolk State University, 2009 NFL Draft Pick
- Roy Ebron, ABA–NBA merger (ABA).
- Samuel L. Green Jr., pastor and bishop
- Bruce Smith, Pro Football Hall of Fame defensive end
- Antoine Thompson, cornerback, Nevada-Reno, signed with the St. Louis Rams in 2010
- Wilson Washington, played for two seasons in the National Basketball Association
- Pernell Whitaker, several-time World Boxing Champion
- Jack Williams, cornerback, Kent State, 2008 NFL Draft Pick
- Samuel Allen (Former Negro League baseball player)

== See also ==
- List of things named after Booker T. Washington
