= Aline Elizabeth Black =

American educator

Aline Elizabeth Black Hicks
- Born: Aline Elizabeth Black; March 23, 1906; Norfolk, Virginia, US
- Died: August 24, 1974 (aged 68); Norfolk, Virginia, US
- Occupation: Educator
- Children: 1

Aline Elizabeth Black, also known under her married name of Aline Elizabeth Black Hicks, (March 23, 1906 – August 24, 1974) was an American educator, known for taking part in a civil rights court case that centered on unequal pay.

In 2008, the Library of Virginia honored Black as part of their Notable African Americans in Virginia History project. Black also received the Education Association of Norfolk's Backbone Award in 1971, in recognition for her role in establishing educational and professional equality.

== Biography ==
Black was born in Norfolk, Virginia on March 23, 1906, to Charles and Ida Black. She was educated locally and attended Booker T. Washington High School. Black went on to receive a degree from the Virginia Normal and Industrial Institute and received a Master of Science at the University of Pennsylvania in 1935. While in school, Black began working as a teacher at Booker T. Washington High School until she lost her job in 1939 as retaliation for a legal case over salary discrimination. After losing her job, Black began working on a chemistry doctorate at New York University, but did not complete the degree. Black was re-hired as an employee of the Norfolk School Board in 1941 and resumed her former job as a chemistry teacher. She remained in this job until 1970, after which point she began working at Jacox Junior High School as an instructional development specialist until her retirement in 1973.

Black married Frank A. Hicks at some point during World War II and had one daughter. She died in Norfolk on August 22, 1974, aged 68, in Norfolk.

== Legal case ==
While she was attending college, Black began working in Norfolk as a science instructor in the public school system. Black received only two-thirds of what a white teacher received for the same job, a common occurrence for African-American educators. This fact was the focus of ire from the Norfolk Teachers Association and the Virginia State Teachers Association, who felt that this racial inequality was a violation of the Fourteenth Amendment to the United States Constitution. In October 1938, Black petitioned the Norfolk School Board to base their educators' salaries on experience and qualifications rather than race or color. The school board denied her petition, stating that Black had waived any right to contest the pay or seek redress when she signed her yearly contract. With the backing of the teachers' associations and the cooperation of the NAACP, Black then filed a suit against the Norfolk school board in March 1939, marking her as the first teacher to file a salary discrimination suit in the state of Virginia. She was accompanied by a team of attorneys, one of which was the future Associate Justice of the Supreme Court of the United States Thurgood Marshall. Black's suit was dismissed and her attorneys appealed to the Virginia Supreme Court of Appeals. In the meantime the Norfolk School Board retaliated against Black for her lawsuit by not renewing her contract in June 1939. As she was no longer an employee and did not have the standing to sue, the court system denied Black's appeal. The school board's actions were highly criticized and the focus of a protest on June 24 of the same year.

Undeterred, the teachers associations produced another plaintiff, Melvin O. Alston, who filed another suit against the school board, Alston v. School Board of City of Norfolk. This lawsuit succeeded in going to the United States Supreme Court, who upheld a ruling that teacher salaries fell under the Fourteenth Amendment.
