= Granby Township =

Granby Township may refer to the following townships in the United States:

- Granby Township, Nicollet County, Minnesota
- Granby Township, Newton County, Missouri

== See also ==
- Granby (disambiguation)
