= Basnight =

Basnight is a surname. Notable people with the surname include:

- Marc Basnight (1947–2020), American politician
- Michael Basnight (born 1977), American football player
