= Kenny Gallop =

American football player

Kenny Gallop Jr.
No. 0
- Position: Safety

Personal information
- Listed height: 5 ft 11 in (1.80 m)
- Listed weight: 216 lb (98 kg)

Career information
- High school: Churchland High School
- College: Howard (2021–2024)
- Stats at ESPN

Kenny Gallop is an American former college football safety for the Howard Bison.

== Early life ==
Gallop attended Churchland High School in Portsmouth, Virginia, and committed to play college football for the Howard Bison.

== College career ==
In his first two collegiate seasons in 2021 and 2022, Gallop notched 138 tackles with nine and a half for a loss, four pass deflections, and a forced fumble. In week 8 of the 2023 season, he tallied 11 tackles and the game-sealing interception as he helped the Bison to a win over Norfolk State, and was named the FCS National Defensive Player of the Week for his performance. Gallop finished his breakout 2023 season with 61 tackles with six being for a loss, three interceptions, and two forced fumbles, earning Mid-Eastern Athletic Conference (MEAC) defensive player of the year honors while helping the Bison to a MEAC championship. Gallop was also named the 2023 Aeneas Williams Award winner, which is awarded to the HBCU's top defensive back. Heading into the 2024 season, Gallop was named the preseason MEAC defensive player of the year. After the conclusion of the 2024 season, he decided to declare and enter his name into the 2025 NFL draft. Gallop finished his collegiate career for the Bison playing in 42 career games where he totaled 319 tackles with 16 tackles for a loss, four and a half sacks, 17 pass breakups, and three forced fumbles.

== Professional career ==
Pre-draft measurables
Height	Weight	Arm length	Hand span
5 ft 10 7/8 in (1.80 m)	216 lb (98 kg)	31 1/2 in (0.80 m)	8 7/8 in (0.23 m)
All values from HBCU Combine
