= T. J. Jordan =

Personal information
- Born: March 16, 1986 (age 40) Denver, Colorado, U.S.
- Listed height: 5 ft 8 in (1.73 m)

Career information
- High school: Woodrow Wilson (Portsmouth, Virginia)
- College: Old Dominion (2004–2008)
- WNBA draft: 2008: undrafted
- Position: Point guard

Taurean Yves Jordan (born March 16, 1986, in Denver, Colorado) is a women's basketball player who played collegiately for Old Dominion University. She holds several ODU scoring records, and was regarded as one of the best players in the Colonial Athletic Association.

Jordan attended Woodrow Wilson High School in Portsmouth, Virginia, where she was friends with LaShawn Merritt. Along with Khadijah Whittington, she led Wilson to its first ever women's basketball state championship game and was named Virginia High School Coaches' Player of the Year. She was named MVP of the 2006 CAA Tournament after setting an NCAA record with ten three-pointers against Northeastern University. Jordan is noted for her adeptness at making three-pointers. Twice named the MVP of the CAA, Jordan was generally seen as the face of the Lady Monarchs during her time on the team.

During her senior season Jordan led the Lady Monarchs to their twenty-fifth consecutive NCAA Women's Division I Basketball Championship, leading the team with 13.3 points per game. Old Dominion defeated Liberty University in the first round on the 2008 NCAA Women's Division I Basketball Tournament, giving the Lady Monarchs their first tournament win since 2002. She had fourteen points in a second-round overtime victory over Virginia; Old Dominion faced Connecticut in the Sweet Sixteen, falling to the Huskies 78–63, with Jordan being held to three points in her final collegiate game.

While considered a draft prospect, Jordan was not selected in the 2008 WNBA draft. However, she has tried out for the United States women's national basketball team.

== Old Dominion University statistics ==
Legend
| GP | Games played | GS | Games started | MPG | Minutes per game |
| FG% | Field goal percentage | 3P% | 3-point field goal percentage | FT% | Free throw percentage |
| RPG | Rebounds per game | APG | Assists per game | SPG | Steals per game |
| BPG | Blocks per game | PPG | Points per game | **Bold** | Career high |

| Year | Team | GP | Points | FG% | 3P% | FT% | RPG | APG | SPG | BPG | PPG |
| 2004-05 | Old Dominion University | 31 | 201 | 33.3% | 29.7% | 48.0% | 2.7 | 0.8 | 0.7 | 0.2 | 6.5 |
| 2005-06 | Old Dominion University | 31 | 414 | **40.8%** | **37.5%** | 69.6% | 3.0 | 2.3 | **1.3** | 0.1 | 13.4 |
| 2006-07 | Old Dominion University | 33 | **479** | 37.6% | 35.7% | 74.2% | 3.4 | 2.2 | 1.3 | **0.3** | **14.5** |
| 2007-08 | Old Dominion University | **34** | 431 | 36.7% | 32.5% | **74.7%** | **3.5** | **2.4** | 1.1 | 0.0 | 12.7 |
| Career | | 129 | 1525 | 37.5% | 34.3% | 70.8% | 3.2 | 1.9 | 1.1 | 0.1 | 11.8 |
