= Portsmouth Public Schools =

School in Virginia

Address
- 801 Crawford Street Portsmouth, Virginia, 23704; United States

District information
- Type: Public
- Grades: Pre-K through 12
- Superintendent: Elie Bracy, III
- School board: 9 members
- Chair of the board: Cardell C. Patillo
- Governing agency: Virginia Department of Education
- Schools: 24

Other information
- Website: ppsk12.us

Portsmouth Public Schools is a school district headquartered in Portsmouth, Virginia. There are 3 Prek centers, 15 elementary schools, 3 middle schools, 3 high schools, and 2 other education centers.

== Administration ==
=== Superintendent ===
The superintendent of Portsmouth Public Schools is Elie Bracy, III. He began as superintendent at the beginning of the 2015-16 school year. Dr. Bracy previously served as the superintendent Weldon City Schools from 2005 to 2015. He also served as the director of elementary education and assistant superintendent of curriculum at Northampton County Schools, a school administrator in Wayne County Public Schools, and a guidance counselor/teacher in Northampton County. His brother, Eric is the superintendent for Johnson County School District in North Carolina

=== School Board ===
There are 9 members on the Portsmouth Public School Board

- LaKeesha S. "Klu" Atkinson (Vice-Chairwoman)
- Lateacia Sessoms
- Dr. Melvin Cotton
- Cardell C. Patillo (Chairman)
- Tamara L. Shewmake
- Irene Boone
- Quniana Futrell
- Dr. Jackie Walker
- Arnette D. “Love” McSwain

== Schools ==
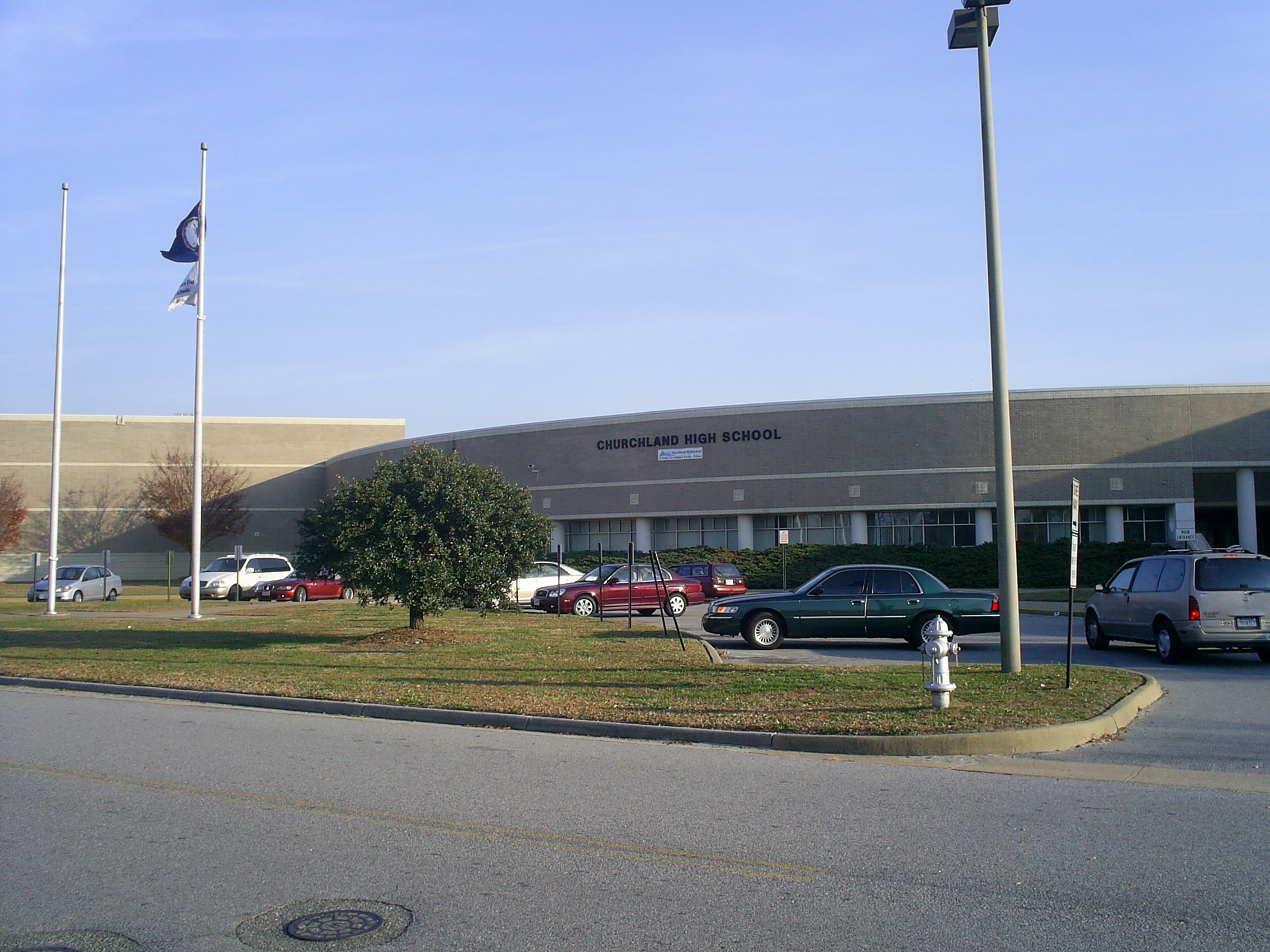
Churchland High School

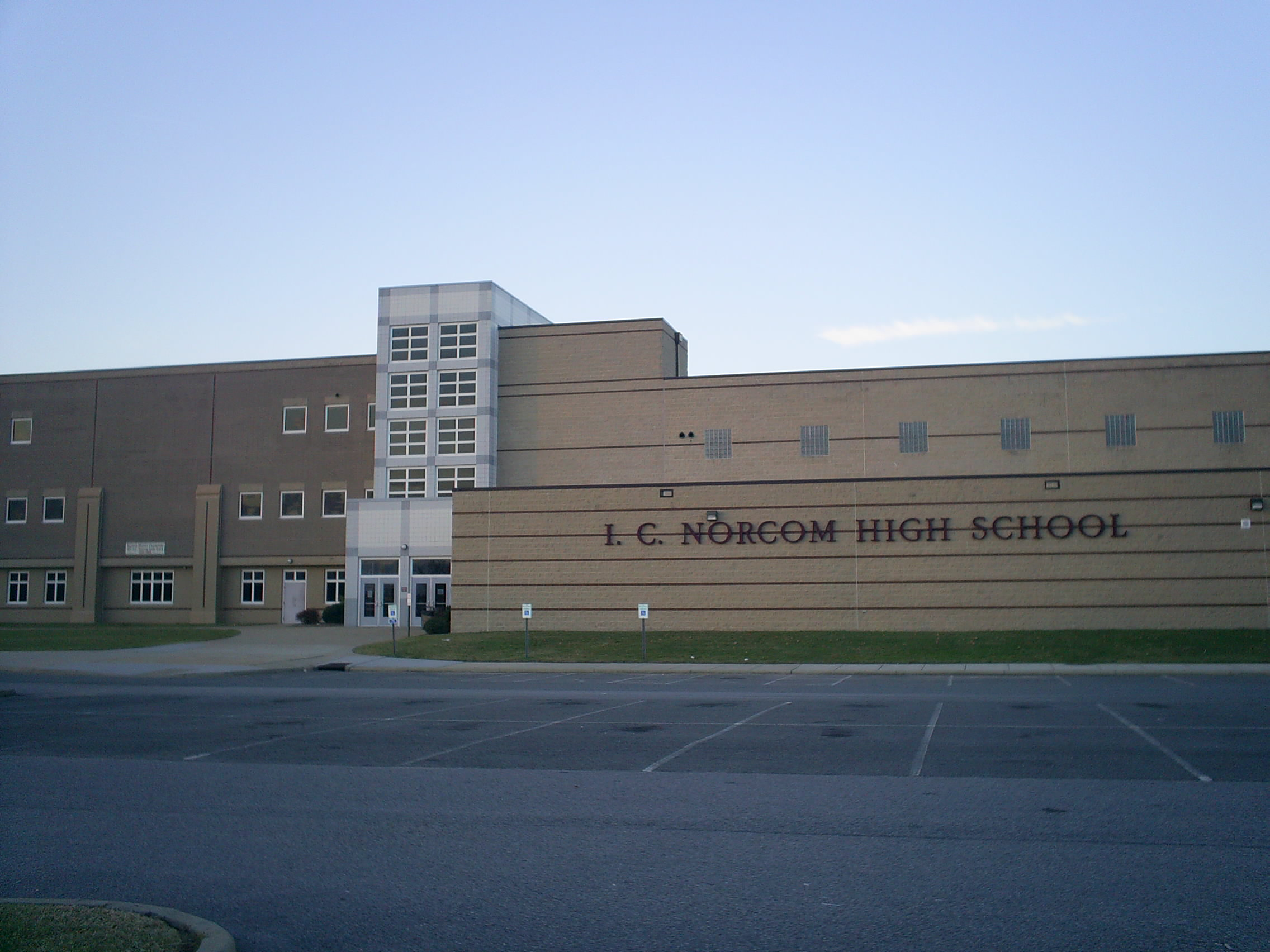
I. C. Norcom High School

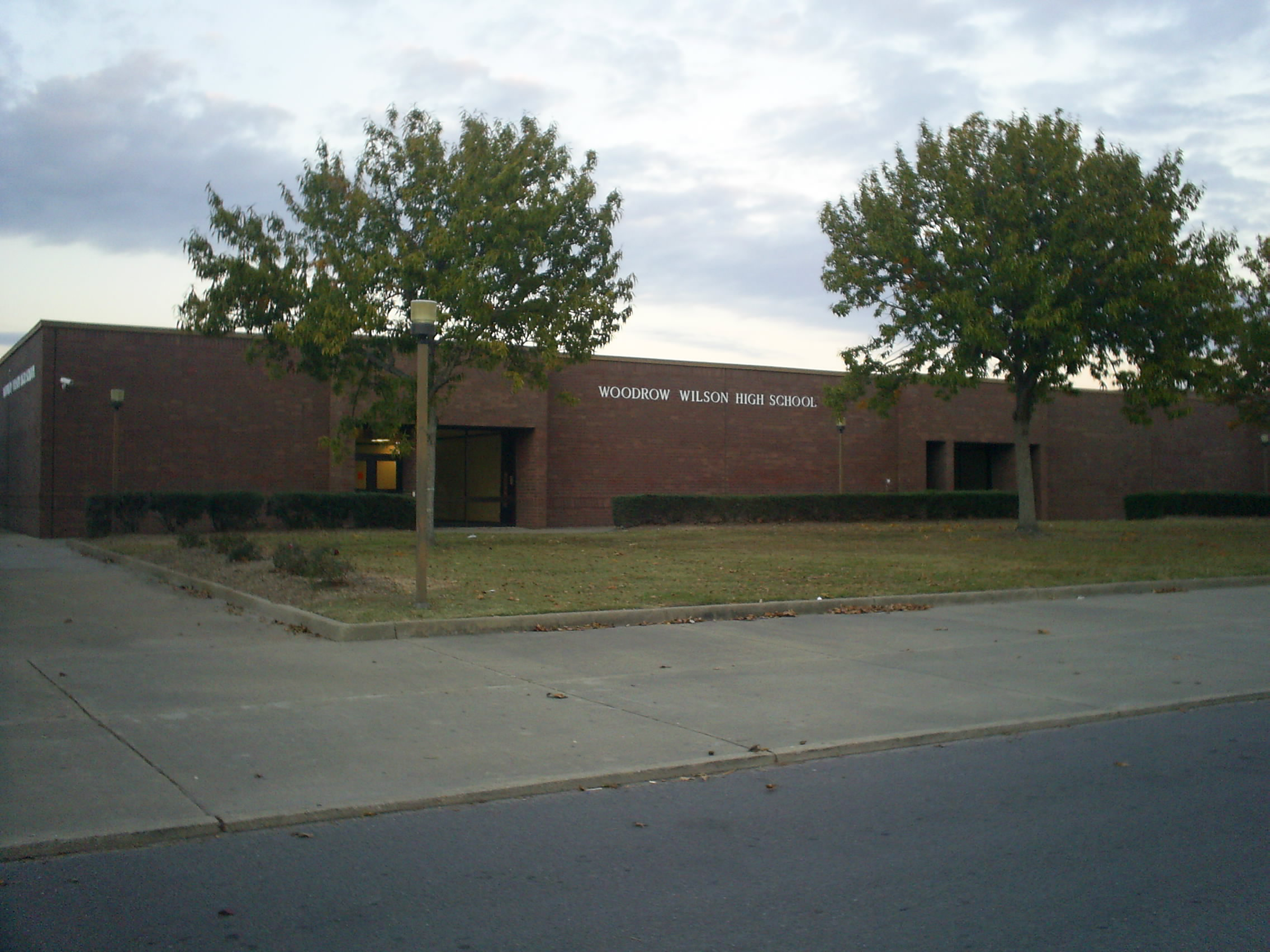
Manor High School

=== High schools ===
- Churchland High School
- I. C. Norcom High School
- Manor High School

=== Middle schools ===
- Churchland Middle School
- Cradock Middle School
- William E. Waters Middle School

=== Elementary schools ===
- Brighton Elementary School
- Churchland Academy Elementary School
- Churchland Elementary School
- Churchland Primary & Intermediate School
- Douglass Park Elementary
- Hodges Manor Elementary School
- James Hurst Elementary School
- John Tyler Elementary School
- Lakeview Elementary School
- Park View Elementary School
- Simonsdale Elementary School
- Victory Elementary School
- Westhaven Elementary School

=== Preschools ===
- Churchland Preschool Center
- Emily Spong Preschool Center
- Mt. Hermon Preschool Center
- Olive Branch Preschool Center
