= Levi Brown (offensive tackle) =

American football player (born 1984)

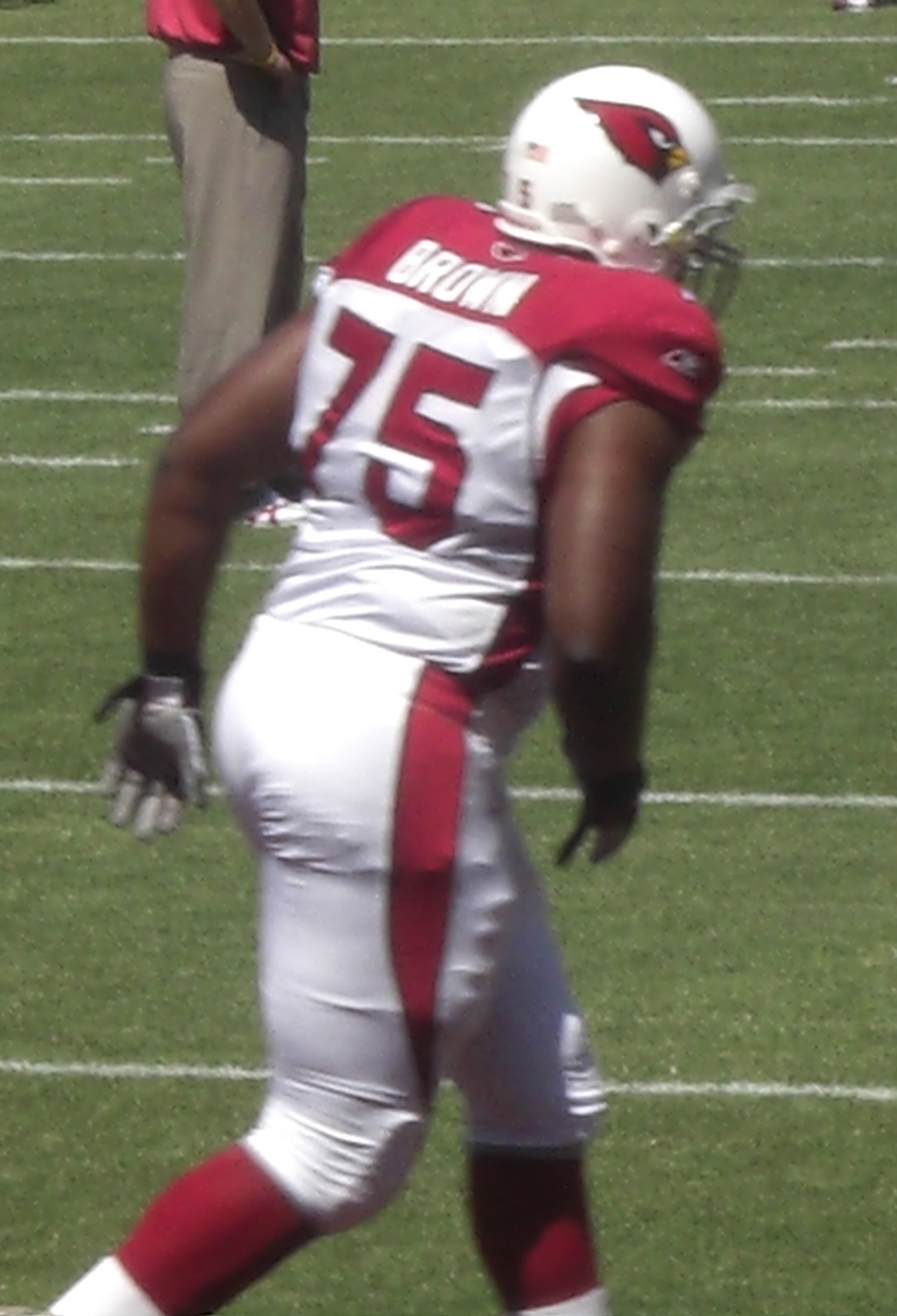
- Brown with the Arizona Cardinals in 2008

No. 67, 75
- Position: Offensive tackle

Personal information
- Born: March 16, 1984 (age 42); Jacksonville, North Carolina, U.S.
- Listed height: 6 ft 6 in (1.98 m)
- Listed weight: 324 lb (147 kg)

Career information
- High school: Granby (Norfolk, Virginia)
- College: Penn State (2002–2006)
- NFL draft: 2007: 1st round, 5th overall pick

Career history
- Arizona Cardinals (2007–2013); Pittsburgh Steelers (2013)

Awards and highlights
- Second-team All-American (2005); Third-team All-American (2006); 2× First-team All-Big Ten (2005, 2006)

Career NFL statistics
- Games played: 81
- Games started: 79
- Fumble recoveries: 6
- Stats at Pro Football Reference

Levi James Brown III (born March 16, 1984) is an American former professional football player who was an offensive tackle in the National Football League (NFL). He was selected by the Arizona Cardinals fifth overall in the 2007 NFL draft. He played college football for the Penn State Nittany Lions.

== Early life ==
Brown attended Granby High School in Norfolk, Virginia and was a student and a letterman in football and basketball. In football, he was a two-year starter as both an offensive lineman and a defensive end. As a senior, he helped lead his team to an 8–2 record and was a first-team All-Tidewater selection and a Second-team All-State selection on both offense and defense by the Virginia high school coaches. After his senior season, he participated in the U.S. Army All-American Bowl Game alongside future Arizona Cardinals teammate Travarous Bain.

== College career ==
Originally listed as a defensive lineman, Brown redshirted his freshman season in 2002. In 2003, as a redshirt freshman, he started all 12 games at left tackle and played 841 snaps. In 2004, as a sophomore, Brown started 10 games, including 1 game at right tackle against Iowa, and played 630 snaps. In 2005, as a junior, he started every game at left tackle and played 869 snaps. He was named an Associated Press and Sports Illustrated second-team All-American as well as a first-team All-Big Ten selection. In 2006, he anchored a young offensive line, still earning All-American accolades.

Brown earned a Bachelor of Science in Labor & Industrial Relations from Penn State in 2005, and Bachelor of Science in Psychology. Before his NFL career began Brown started his master's program. In 2011 Brown began taking one master's course each offseason via Penn State World Campus. Brown worked as an intern at a law firm during the process, and he finished the research portion of the program by assisting a company with its human resource practices. In May 2016 Brown graduated with his Master of Professional Studies for Human Resources & Employment Relations (HRER).

== Professional career ==
=== Pre-draft ===
Considered one of the best offensive tackles available in the 2007 NFL draft, Brown drew comparisons to Marcus McNeill.

Pre-draft measurables
Height	Weight	Arm length	Hand span	40-yard dash	10-yard split	20-yard split	20-yard shuttle	Three-cone drill	Vertical jump	Broad jump	Bench press
6 ft 5 1/2 in (1.97 m)	323 lb (147 kg)	34 3/8 in (0.87 m)	9 1/2 in (0.24 m)	5.39 s	1.89 s	3.11 s	4.89 s	7.87 s	25.5 in (0.65 m)	8 ft 1 in (2.46 m)	31 reps
All values from the NFL Combine

=== Arizona Cardinals ===
Brown was selected by the Arizona Cardinals as the fifth pick in the first round. He was the sixth offensive lineman in Penn State history to be selected in a first round of an NFL draft, and the first since Jeff Hartings in 1996. He agreed to terms with the Cardinals on August 2, 2007, six days after the team reported to training camp. The six-year contract could be worth up to $62 million, just over $18 million of it guaranteed. He is represented by fellow Penn-Stater Chafie Fields. On October 10, 2010, Brown scored a touchdown in a game against the New Orleans Saints after quarterback Max Hall fumbled the ball near the goal-line.

He was released on March 12, 2012, but re-signed on March 15, 2012. He was placed on injured reserve with a torn triceps on August 24, 2012. In his first regular season game since returning from the triceps injury, Brown gave up 3 sacks to Robert Quinn one of which was a fumble that was recovered by Brown.

=== Pittsburgh Steelers ===
Brown was traded to the Pittsburgh Steelers on October 2, 2013, for a conditional late-round draft selection.

On March 5, 2014, Brown was released by the Steelers.
