= L. Glenn Perry =

Former Chief Accountant of the U.S. Securities and Exchange Commission

Lloyd Glenn Perry (October 28, 1944 – October 21, 1998) was the first Chief Accountant of the United States Securities and Exchange Commission. His appointment to this post by Ronald Reagan was announced on September 23, 1982, in the SEC News Digest.

He led numerous actions against publicly traded companies for false financial reporting and disclosure known as "cooking the books." Most notable of these was the action against California's Financial Corp. of America. After an investigation by Perry and the SEC, the company was forced to re-report second-quarter profits in 1984 to show a $107.5 million loss instead of a $31.1 million profit. This case is credited with being the first indication of the savings and loan crisis of the 1980s.

He became a recognized expert in policing false financial disclosure and articles written by him such as "Policing Financial Disclosure Fraud: The SEC's Top Priority" are still referenced and used in college accounting text books such as "Accounting Theory" (ISBN 0471189081 LCC: HF5625) edited by Richard G. Schroeder and Myrtle W. Clark and published by John Wiley & Sons.

He was born on October 28, 1944, in Gatesville, North Carolina. He graduated from Churchland High School in Portsmouth, Virginia and was a star baseball player and track athlete. He graduated from Old Dominion College in 1967 and was a member of the Alpha Kappa Psi business fraternity.

He was Chairman of the Ethics Committee of the American Institute of Certified Public Accountants.

He was a senior partner of the accounting firm KPMG retiring as head of the Office of Ethics and Professional Practice. Upon being made a partner in 1976 at the age of 31, he was the youngest person to achieve that in the firm's history at that time.
