= Beverly Middleton =

Virginia businessman and politician

Beverly Randolph Middleton (1928 – 1996) was an engineer and politician in Virginia. He ran a construction firm. A Democrat, Middleton served in the Virginia House of Delegates from 1968 to 1973. In 1973 he ran unsuccessfully as an independent.

He attended Norview High School and Virginia Polytechnic Institute. Old Dominion University has a collection of his papers.
