= Manor High School (Portsmouth, Virginia) =

American public high school in Portsmouth, Virginia

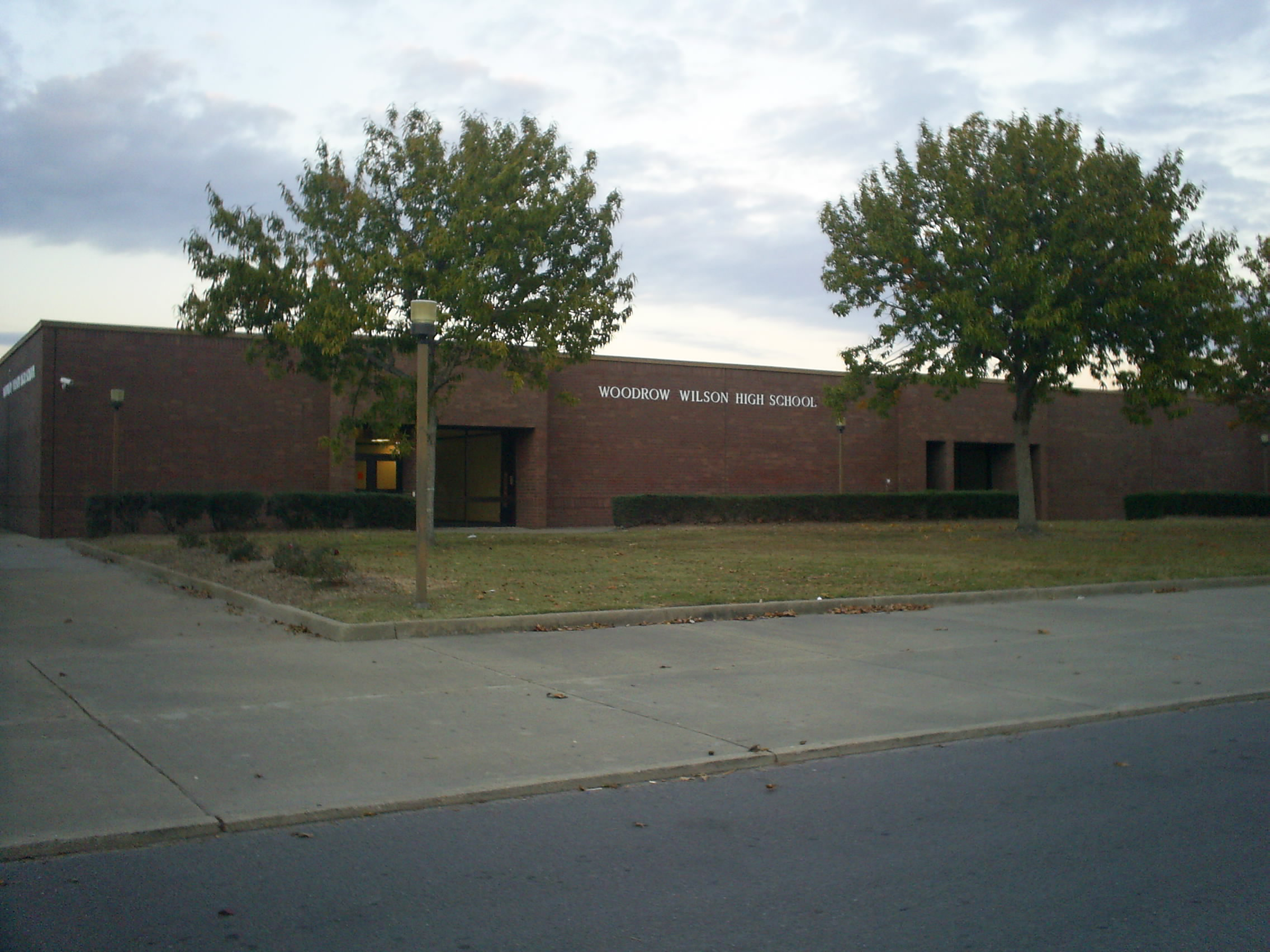

Location
- 1401 Elmhurst Lane; Portsmouth, Virginia 23701; United States; 36°48′54.45″N 76°22′53.05″W

Information
- Type: Public high school
- Founded: 1972; 54 years ago
- School district: Portsmouth City Public Schools
- Superintendent: Elie Bracy, III
- Principal: Timothy Johnson
- Teaching staff: 90.00 (FTE) (2023–24)
- Grades: 9–12
- Enrollment: 1,167 (2023–24)
- Student to teacher ratio: 12.97:1 (2023–24)
- Campus: Suburban
- Colors: Red, Black and White
- Athletics conference: Virginia High School League; Class 3 Region A; Eastern District
- Mascot: Mustangs
- Rival: Norcom Greyhounds
- Website: mhs.ppsk12.us

Manor High School is a public high school located in Portsmouth, Virginia that opened in 1972. The name "Manor" was chosen from two surrounding communities, Hodges Manor and Elizabeth Manor. In 1993, due to a declining student population, Portsmouth Public Schools consolidated three high schools into one building. Woodrow Wilson High School's building was converted into a combined middle school (Hunt-Mapp) and Cradock High School was closed. The Cradock name was applied to the former Alfred J. Mapp Junior High School. The Manor campus was chosen for the high school, as the newest of the 3 buildings, but the name would be changed to reflect the school with the longer history, Woodrow Wilson High School. This name change remained in effect until July 2021. Manor High School is administered by Portsmouth City Public Schools. The school colors are red, black and white, and Mustangs are the school's mascot.

== History ==
Although Manor High School only dates back to 1972, Woodrow Wilson High School can be traced back to 1885, when a high school was organized at The Academy on Glasgow Street. This school housed only grammar and elementary students from 1850 through 1884. The first high school class graduated that same year. In 1886 the Glasgow Street building was no longer suitable, so the city erected a new building on Green Street, known as the Green Street School. High school, grammar, and elementary students moved there from the Glasgow Street location in September 1886.

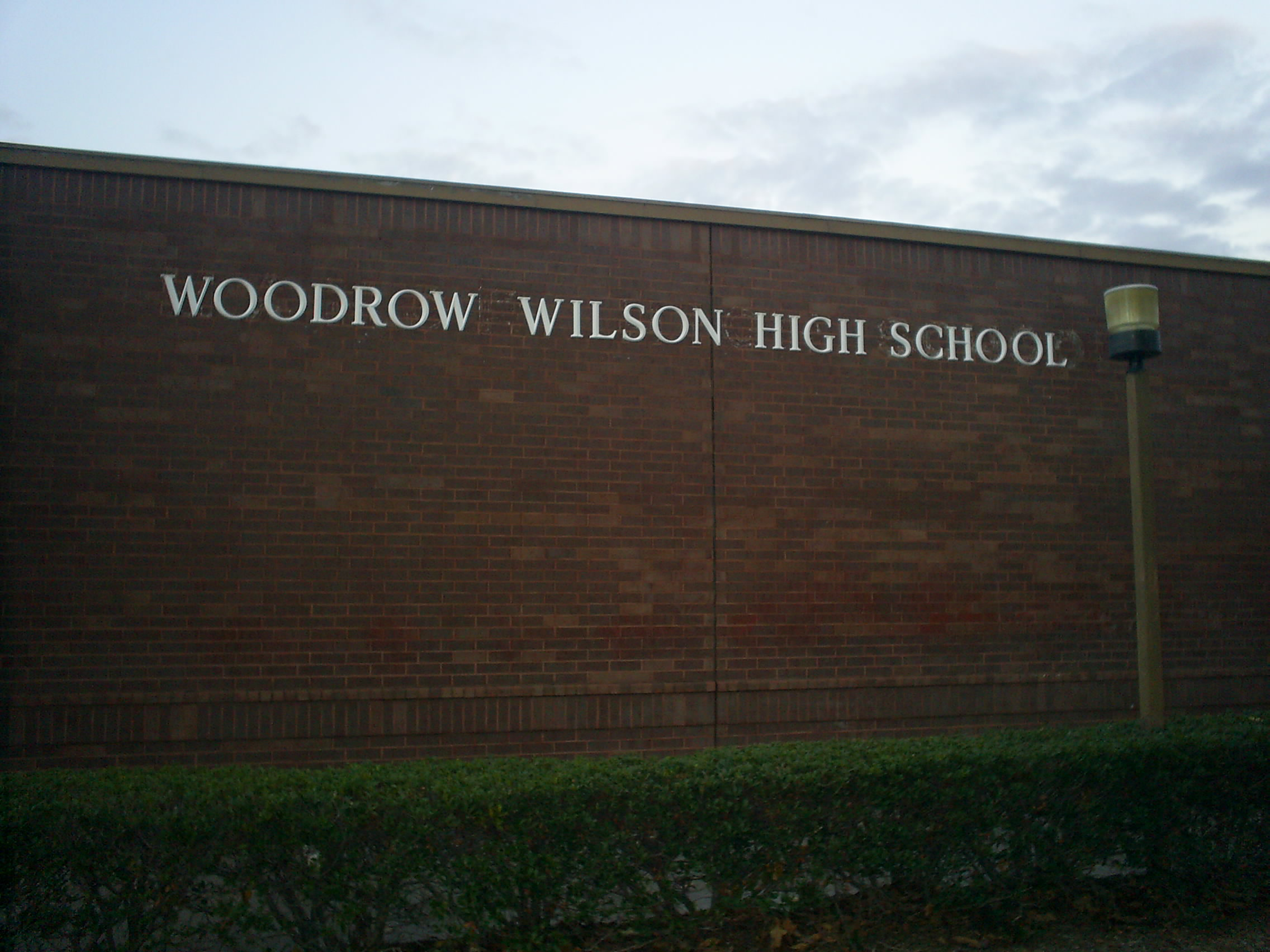

In 1888, Portsmouth High School was formally established but continued to be housed in the Green Street building. Portsmouth High School moved to a brand new building on Washington Street in 1909. The new facility was the first one planned for the exclusive use of the high school.

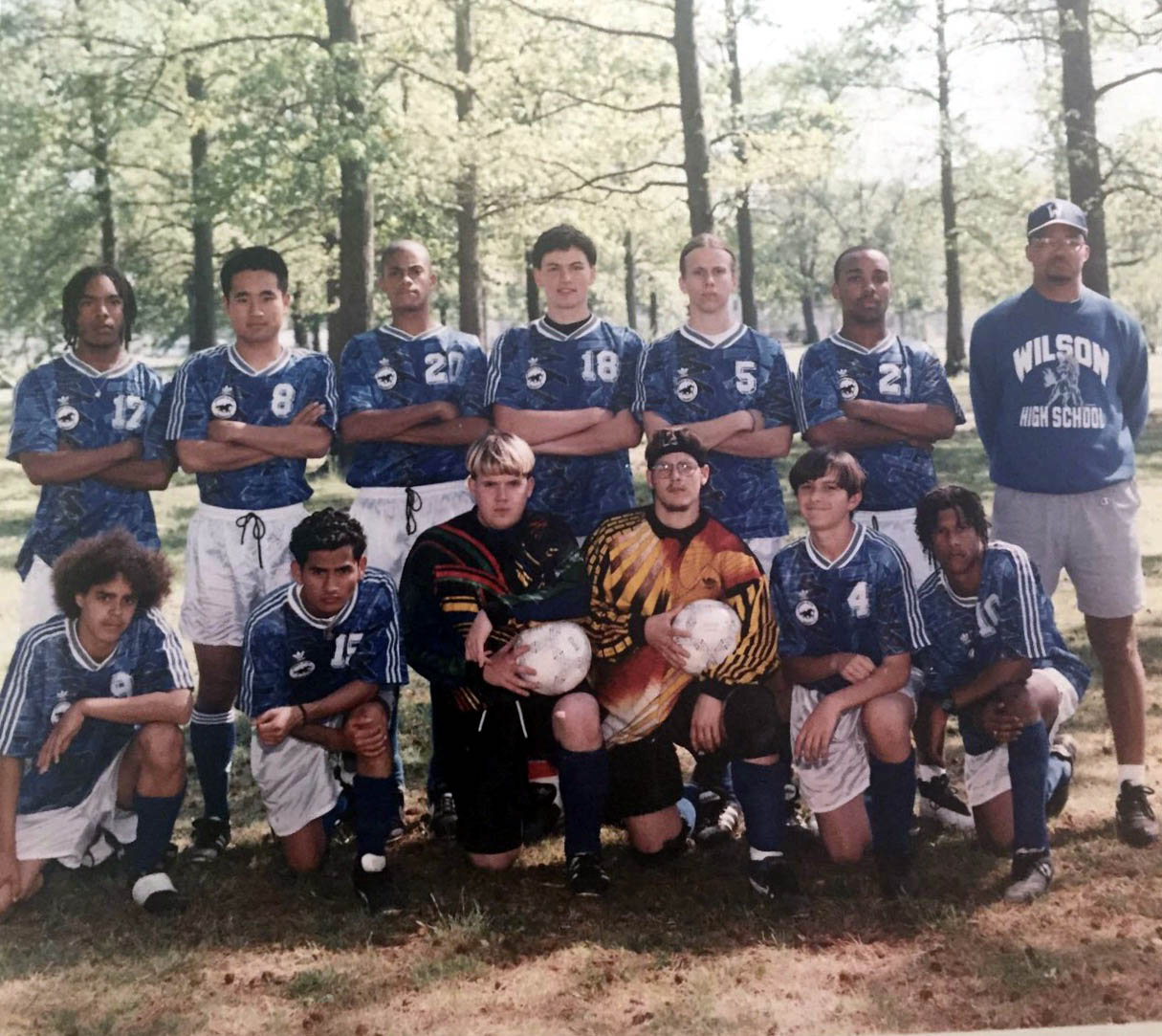
Wilson High soccer team in 1995 led by coach Green.

In September 1919, Portsmouth High School was renamed Woodrow Wilson High School and moved to a new building on High Street. The vacated building became an elementary school called Washington Street School, and later F.T. Briggs School. In September 1955, Woodrow Wilson High School moved again to a new facility on Willett Drive, and the vacated building on High Street became Harry Hunt Junior High School. In September 1993, Woodrow Wilson High School was combined with Cradock High School, and Manor High School. The three schools were merged into the Manor building, under the Woodrow Wilson High School name.

The school, along with others in the area, has recently become noted for its high dropout rates. The school has made news headlines for school shooting, gang activity, mace spray use in school fights, sexual contact between a recruiter and a student, threats made to the school, and the school's students being murdered off school grounds.

In 2020, residents initiated the petition to abolish the use of Wilson's name and change the name to Manor. On December 3, 2020, the Portsmouth School Board, responding to calls to remove Woodrow Wilson's name from the school, voted 8 - 1 to restore the name Manor High School, effective July 1, 2021.

== Notable alumni ==
- V. C. Andrews – author
- Marty Brennaman – sportscaster for the Cincinnati Reds
- Karen Briggs – violinist
- Mahlon Clark – jazz musician
- LaTasha Colander – track and field sprint star, 2000 Olympic Gold Medalist (4 × 400 m)
- Mark Steven Davis - Chief United States district judge of the United States District Court for the Eastern District of Virginia.
- Bill Deal – beach music musician with group Bill Deal and the Rhondels
- Missy Elliott – rapper
- Perry Ellis – fashion designer
- Chandler Harper, golfer
- Ben Jones – actor and politician
- T. J. Jordan – basketball player
- LaShawn Merritt – sprinter, 2008 Olympic Gold medalist (400 meters and 4 × 400 m relay)
- Bill Moran – Former Major League Baseball player
- Clarence "Ace" Parker, Pro Football Hall of Famer and Former MLB player
- Bill Schneider – journalist with CNN
- Aaron Sparrow, American football player
- Jurij Toplak, constitutional scholar, university professor and election law expert
- Khadijah Whittington – Former WNBA basketball player
- Dionne Price – President, American Statistical Association.
