= Mike Tyson (American football) =

American football player (born 1993)

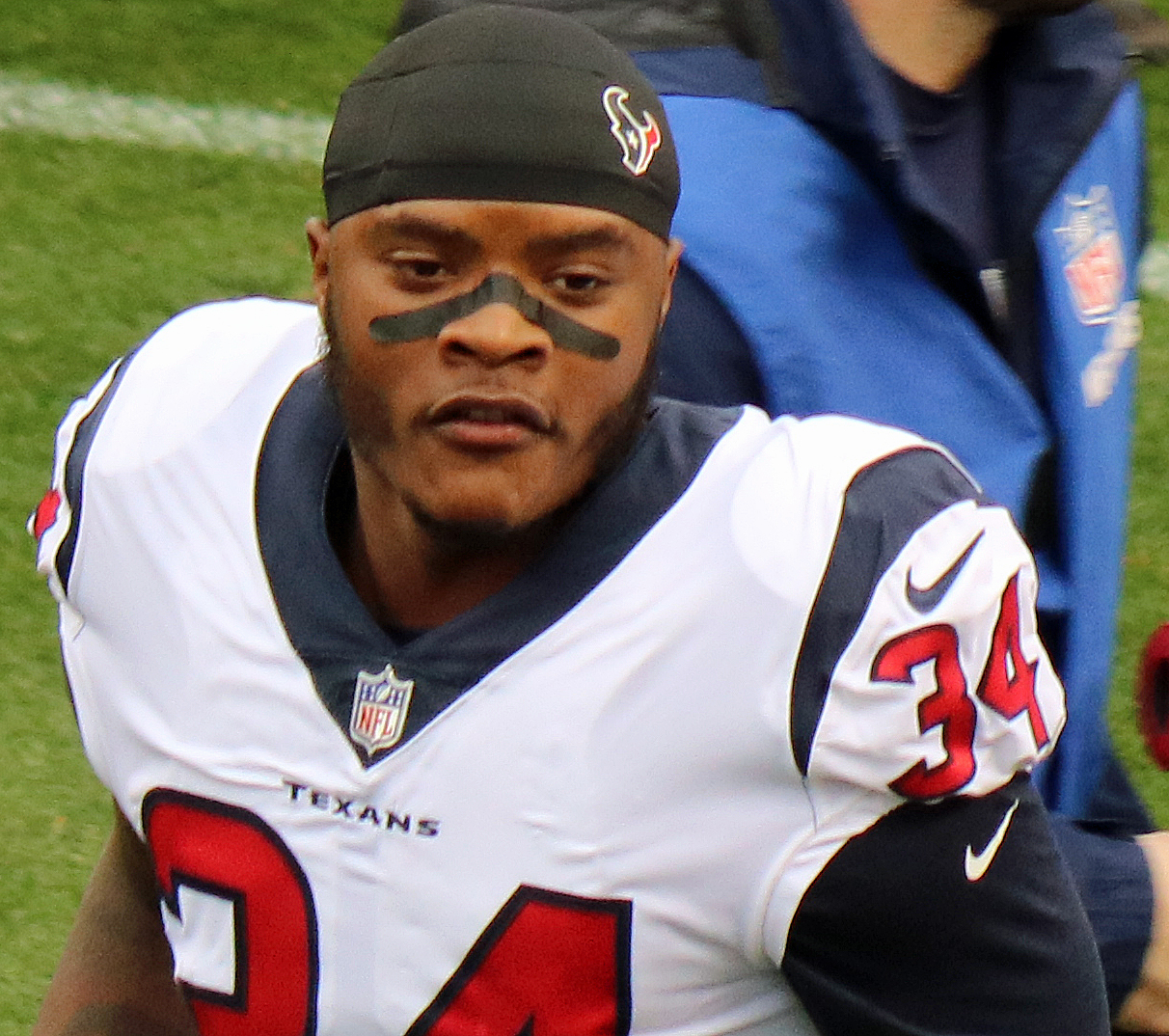
- Tyson with the Houston Texans in 2018

No. 34
- Position: Safety

Personal information
- Born: July 27, 1993 (age 33); Norfolk, Virginia, U.S.
- Listed height: 6 ft 1 in (1.85 m)
- Listed weight: 210 lb (95 kg)

Career information
- High school: Lake Taylor (Norfolk)
- College: Cincinnati
- NFL draft: 2017: 6th round, 187th overall pick

Career history
- Seattle Seahawks (2017); Houston Texans (2018); Green Bay Packers (2019)*; Toronto Argonauts (2021)*
- * Offseason or practice squad member only

Career NFL statistics
- Total tackles: 5
- Pass deflections: 1
- Stats at Pro Football Reference

Michael Jamont'e Tyson (born July 27, 1993) is an American former professional football player who was a safety in the National Football League (NFL). He was selected by the Seattle Seahawks in the sixth round, 187th overall of the 2017 NFL draft. He played college football for the Cincinnati Bearcats. He was also a member of the Houston Texans, Green Bay Packers and Toronto Argonauts.

== Early life ==
Tyson attended Lake Taylor High School in Norfolk, Virginia before attending Hargrave Military Academy for his senior year.

Tyson was rated as a four-star recruit by Scout.com and a three-star recruit from Rivals.com. He was recruited by Robert Prunty, defensive coordinator at the University of Cincinnati at the time, and committed to play college football at Cincinnati.

== College career ==
At the University of Cincinnati, Tyson played in 43 games at the safety position, playing since his first year. Tyson recorded seven interceptions in college, five of which came his senior season, the only season he started. He also logged 137 career tackles and a fumble recovery.

== Professional career ==
Pre-draft measurables
Height	Weight	Arm length	Hand span	40-yard dash	Vertical jump	Broad jump	Bench press
6 ft 1 in (1.85 m)	204 lb (93 kg)	31 3/4	9 1/4	4.56 s	33 in (0.84 m)	9 ft 10 in (3.00 m)	17 reps
Values from NFL Combine

=== Seattle Seahawks ===
Tyson was selected by the Seattle Seahawks in the sixth round, 187th overall, in the 2017 NFL draft. On May 17, 2017, Tyson signed a four-year deal worth $2.5 million overall with a $172,000 signing bonus.

Tyson entered the NFL draft as a safety, the position he played at Cincinnati, though shortly after being drafted by the Seahawks, general manager John Schneider announced that Tyson would transition to cornerback. He was waived on September 2, 2017, and was signed to the Seahawks' practice squad the next day. He was promoted to the active roster on December 16, 2017, but did not play in his rookie season.

On September 1, 2018, Tyson was waived by the Seahawks.

=== Houston Texans ===
On September 3, 2018, Tyson was signed to the Houston Texans' practice squad. He was promoted to the active roster on October 9, 2018. He was placed on injured reserve on January 2, 2019. He was waived on May 10, 2019.

=== Green Bay Packers ===
On May 13, 2019, Tyson was claimed off waivers by the Green Bay Packers. He was waived/injured on August 26, 2019 and placed on injured reserve. He was waived from injured reserve on September 2, 2019.

=== Toronto Argonauts ===
On January 13, 2021, Tyson signed with the Toronto Argonauts of the Canadian Football League (CFL). He was released on June 14, 2021.
