= Alonzo Short =

United States Army general (born 1939)

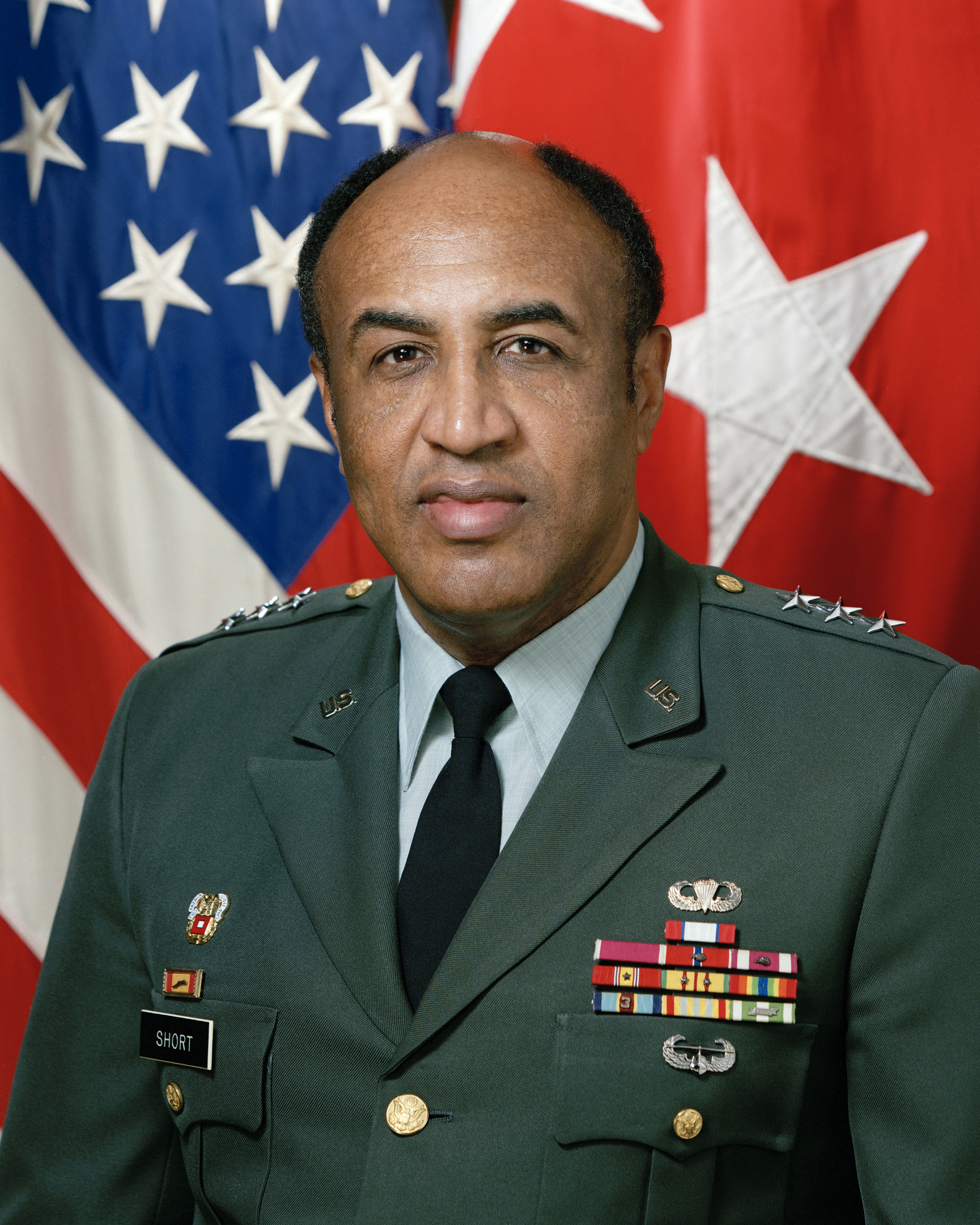
- Born: January 27, 1939 (age 87); Greenville, North Carolina, U.S.
- Military career
- Allegiance: United States of America
- Branch: United States Army
- Service years: 1962–1994
- Rank: Lieutenant General
- Commands: Defense Information Systems Agency; U.S. Army Information Systems Command; U.S. Army Information Systems Engineering Command; U.S. Army Information Systems Management Activity
- Awards: Defense Distinguished Service Medal; Army Distinguished Service Medal; Legion of Merit; Bronze Star Medal (2); Meritorious Service Medal (2)

Alonzo Earl Short Jr. (born January 27, 1939) is a retired United States Army lieutenant general who served as Director of the Defense Information Systems Agency.

Born in North Carolina, Short grew up in Portsmouth, Virginia and attended I. C. Norcom High School. He graduated from Virginia State College with a B.S. degree in education in 1962. Short later earned a master's degree in business management from the New York Institute of Technology.

Short was commissioned through the Army ROTC program. After several Army Signal Corps assignments, he served as executive officer of a signal battalion in Europe. Short was then sent to South Vietnam in 1967 and again in 1972.

As a brigadier general, Short served as commander of U.S. Army Information Systems Management Activity (ISMA) at Fort Monmouth, New Jersey. In July 1986, he became deputy commander of the U.S. Army Information Systems Engineering Command (ISEC) and then assumed command in September 1987. Promoted to major general in September 1988, Short was made deputy commander of the U.S. Army Information Systems Command.

Promoted to lieutenant general in June 1990, Short became the commanding officer of the Information Systems Command. After that, he served as director of the Defense Information Systems Agency from August 1991 to July 1994.

Short has been conferred honorary doctorates by Charles H. Mason University in San Diego and by his alma mater Virginia State University.
