= Lake Taylor High School =

Coordinates: 36°52′8.6″N 76°12′5.8″W

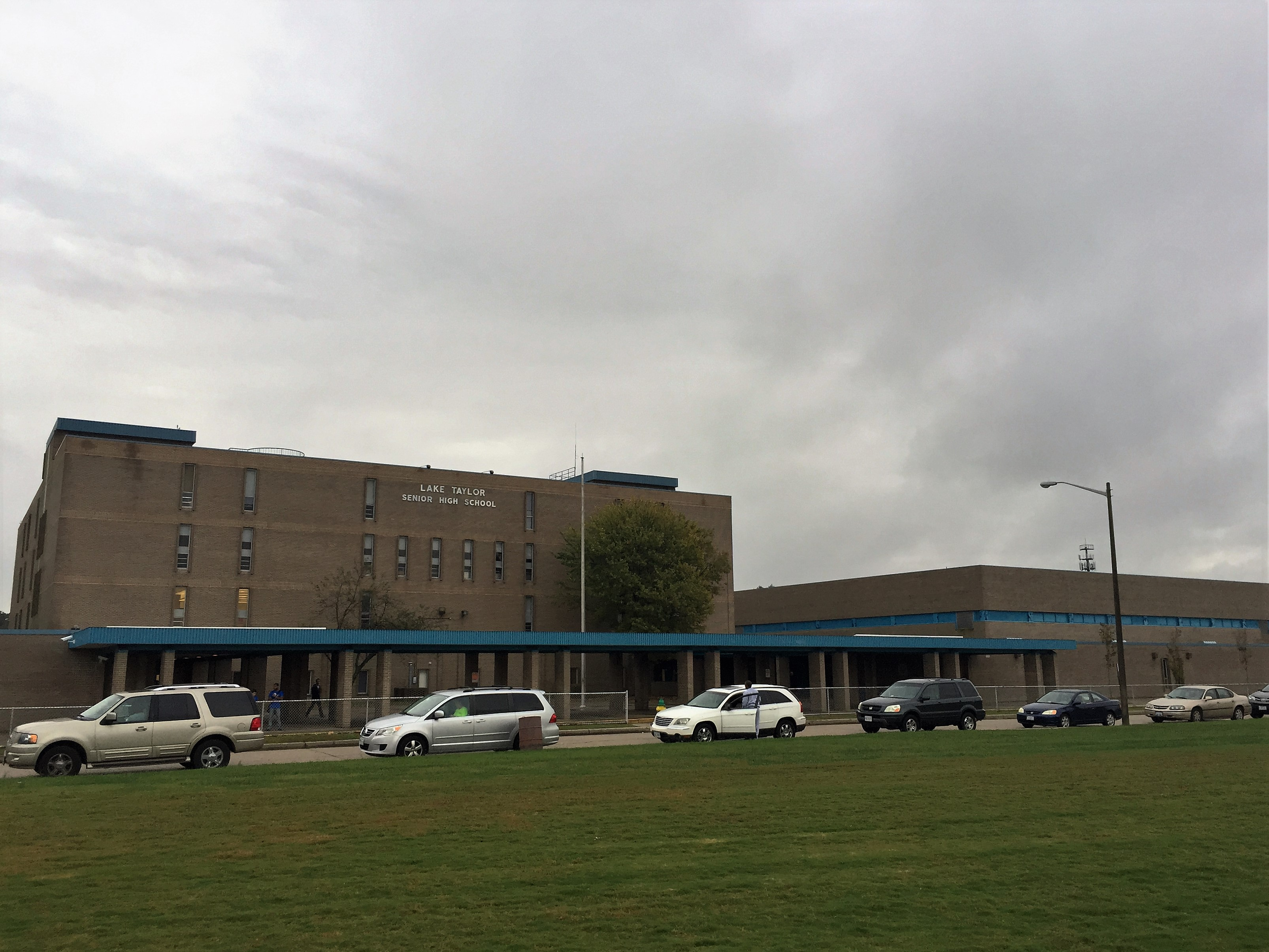

Location
- 1384 Kempsville Road; Norfolk, Virginia 23502; United States

Information
- School type: Public, high school
- Founded: 1967
- School district: Norfolk City Public Schools
- Superintendent: Sharon Byrdsong
- Principal: Latesha N. Wade-Jenkins
- Teaching staff: 79.52 (FTE) (2021–22)
- Grades: 9–12
- Enrollment: 1,012 (2021–22)
- Student to teacher ratio: 12.73 (2021–22)
- Language: English
- Campus: Suburban
- Colors: Red and Black
- Athletics conference: Virginia High School League (Eastern District)
- Mascot: Titans
- Rival: Booker T. W. High School; Norview High School
- Communities served: Berkley, Diggs Town, Oakleaf Park, East Ocean View, Lake Edwards, Crown Point
- Feeder schools: Lake Taylor Middle School; Azalea Gardens Middle School
- Website: Official website

Lake Taylor High School is a public high school located in Norfolk, Virginia, United States and is the "Home of the Mighty Titans". It is administered by Norfolk City Public Schools. The school colors are Crimson, Cream, and Royal Blue and its mascot is the Titans. Lake Taylor High is also the home to a NJROTC program and is called The Academy of Leadership and Military Science.

== Athletics ==
The Titans play in the Eastern District. The football team, led by Hank Sawyer, has won numerous district titles throughout the last two decades, and won the Virginia state championship in 2012, 2014, 2019, and 2025. The football team also finished as runners-up in 1982, losing to George Washington-Danville, Salem High School in 2015, Woodgrove High School in 2018, and Salem again in 2021.

The Lady Titans basketball team won the state championship in 2010 and 2013, defeating Princess Anne High School on both occasions. The Boys Varsity Team finished as runners-up in 2016, and won the state title in 2018.

== Notable alumni ==
- Joe Bryant Jr., professional basketball player
- Julie Forman-Kay, scientist at The Hospital for Sick Children (SickKids) and professor at University of Toronto
- Stephen Furst, actor notable for Animal House
- Kelly Girtz, educator and politician
- Allan Glaser, film producer
- Tommy Graves, NFL outside linebacker; played on the 1979 Super Bowl-winning Pittsburgh Steelers
- Jalyn Holmes, NFL defensive end
- Amos Lawrence, NFL running back
- Marvin Mitchell, NFL linebacker
- JJ Quinerly, WNBA player
- Bob Saget, actor and comedian
- Dereon Seabron, basketball player for the New Orleans Pelicans
- Mike Jamont'e Tyson, NFL cornerback
- Brandon Vera, wrestler; mixed martial artist formerly with Ultimate Fighting Championship current ONE FC Heavyweight Champion
- Wilhelmina Wright, judge of the US District Court for the District of Minnesota
