= George Moody (American football) =

American football player and coach (1937–2017)

Biographical details
- Born: September 24, 1937
- Died: March 6, 2017 (aged 79); Portsmouth, Virginia, U.S.

Playing career
- c. 1960: Virginia State
- Position: Fullback

Coaching career (HC unless noted)
- 1973–1980: Virginia State (assistant)
- 1981–1990: Virginia State
- 1991–1992: Norfolk State (OC)
- 1993–1995: Elizabeth City State
- 1996–1997: Norfolk State (assistant)
- 1998–1999: Elizabeth City State

Head coaching record
- Overall: 68–86–2

Accomplishments and honors

Championships
- 1 CIAA Northern Division (1988)

George Moody (September 24, 1937 – March 6, 2017) was an American college football coach. He served as the head football coach at Virginia State University from 1981 to 1990 and two stints as the head football coach at Elizabeth City State University, from 1993 to 1995 and from 1998 to 1999, compiling a career head coaching record of 68–86–2.

Moody graduated from I. C. Norcom High School in Portsmouth, Virginia He played college football at Virginia State as a fullback. He was an assistant football coach at his alma mater from 1973 until he was appointed head football coach in December 1980.

== Head coaching record ==
| Year | Team | Overall | Conference | Standing | Bowl/playoffs |
|---|---|---|---|---|---|
Virginia State Trojans (Central Intercollegiate Athletics Association) (1981–1990)
| 1981 | Virginia State | 4–6 | 3–4 | T–4th (Northern) | |
| 1982 | Virginia State | 2–8 | 2–5 | 6th (Northern) | |
| 1983 | Virginia State | 4–6 | 2–5 | T–4th (Northern) | |
| 1984 | Virginia State | 5–5 | 4–3 | 3rd (Northern) | |
| 1985 | Virginia State | 4–5–1 | 3–3–1 | 5th (Northern) | |
| 1986 | Virginia State | 6–4 | 5–2 | 2nd (Northern) | |
| 1987 | Virginia State | 9–2 | 6–1 | 2nd (Northern) | |
| 1988 | Virginia State | 7–4 | 5–1 | 1st (Northern) | |
| 1989 | Virginia State | 5–4–1 | 2–3–1 | 5th (Northern) | |
| 1990 | Virginia State | 5–5 | 3–3 | 4th (Northern) | |
| Virginia State: | | 51–49–2 | 35–30–2 | | |
Elizabeth City State Vikings (Central Intercollegiate Athletics Association) (1993–1995)
| 1993 | Elizabeth City State | 2–8 | 1–7 | T–10th | |
| 1994 | Elizabeth City State | 5–6 | 3–5 | 8th | |
| 1995 | Elizabeth City State | 7–4 | 6–2 | T–2nd | |
Elizabeth City State Vikings (Central Intercollegiate Athletics Association) (1998–1999)
| 1998 | Elizabeth City State | 2–9 | 1–6 | 9th | |
| 1999 | Elizabeth City State | 5–6 | 1–6 | T–7th | |
| Elizabeth City State: | | 17–37 | 12–26 | | |
| Total: | | 68–86–2 | | | |
National championship Conference title Conference division title or championship game berth
