= I. C. Norcom High School =

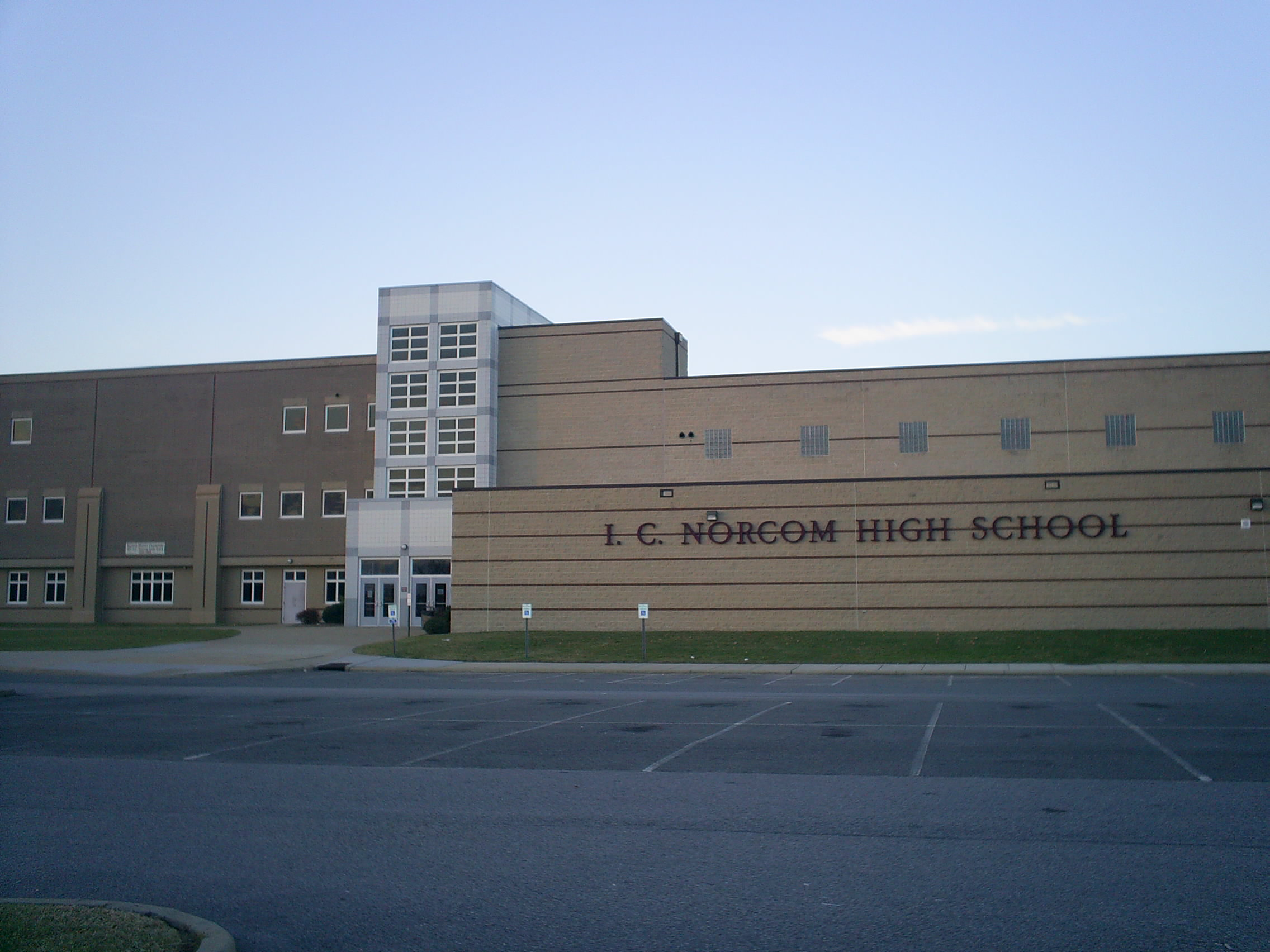

Location
- 1801 London Boulevard; Portsmouth, Virginia 23704; 36°50′9.9″N 76°19′11.1″W

Information
- Other names: Israel Charles Norcom High School
- Former name: Chestnut Street School (1878–1912); High Street School (1913– )
- Type: Public High School
- Founded: 1878
- School district: Portsmouth City Public Schools
- Superintendent: Elie Bracy III
- Principal: Teesha Sanders
- Teaching staff: 79.35 (FTE)
- Grades: 9–12
- Enrollment: 1,092 (2017–18)
- Student to teacher ratio: 13.76
- Language: English
- Campus: City
- Colors: Maroon and Grey
- Athletics conference: Virginia High School League (3A East Region)
- Mascot: Greyhounds
- Rival: Manor High School; Churchland High School; Booker T. W. High School
- Website: nhs.ppsk12.us

I. C. Norcom High School is a public high school located at 1801 London Boulevard in Portsmouth, Virginia, and administered by Portsmouth City Public Schools. The school colors are maroon and grey and greyhounds are the school mascot. A historical marker commemorates his history. It was formerly known as Chestnut Street School, and High Street School.

== History ==
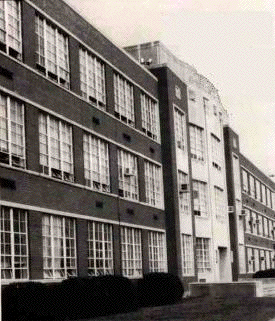
Third school building

I. C. Norcom High School was founded as Chestnut Street School and it opened in 1878, for Black elementary and high school students. In 1913, the name was changed to High Street School for a few years. The I. C. Norcom High School name was changed again, and it was named after Israel Charles Norcom (1856–1916), an African American educator, and its first supervising principal. Other schools named for Norcom have been in various locations.

The current school building opened September 1997 under the leadership of Walter Taylor. The first graduating class of the new location was the class of 1998, but the first graduating class that attended four years at this school was the class of 2002.

== Athletics ==
Norcom's football team won the 1993 state championship, defeating Langley High School 19-0. Norcom's boys basketball team won the 2010 and 2011 VSHL State Championship in Division AAA. The Greyhounds won four straight championships from 2014 to 2017, the first two in division 4A, the others in Division 3A.

== Extracurriculars ==
I. C. Norcom has a well-decorated NJROTC unit. They came in first place in the 2013 Fishbowl parade. They earned top spots in many current competitions and events.

== Notable alumni ==
- E. J. Josey (1940), African-American activist
- James W. Holley III (1944), former mayor of Portsmouth, Virginia
- Ruth Brown (1945), singer known as the Queen of R&B
- Junius Kellogg (1946), basketball player
- L. Louise Lucas, state legislator
- George Moody (1955), college football coach
- Alonzo Short (1957), former director of the Defense Information Systems Agency
- Linda B. Hayden (1967), mathematician
- George Evans (1997), basketball player
- Julius Gregory (2006), football player
- Vernon Macklin (2006 and transferred), NBA player
- Melvin Gregg (2009), actor
- Darius Theus (2009), basketball player
- Dorian Finney-Smith (2011), NBA player
- Joe Powell (2012), football player
- Travis Fields Jr. (2016), basketball player
- Karon Prunty (2020), football player
