= Antoine Thompson (American football) =

American football player (born 1987)

No. 1
- Position: Defensive back

Personal information
- Born: October 3, 1987 (age 39)
- Listed height: 5 ft 11 in (1.80 m)
- Listed weight: 195 lb (88 kg)

Career information
- High school: Booker T. Washington (Norfolk, Virginia)
- College: Nevada-Reno
- NFL draft: 2010: undrafted

Career history
- St. Louis Rams (2010)*; Iowa Barnstormers (2012)
- * Offseason or practice squad member only

Career AFL statistics
- Total Tackles: 14.5
- Interceptions: 2
- Stats at ArenaFan.com

Antoine Thompson (born October 3, 1987) is an American former professional football player for the Iowa Barnstormers.
