= Samuel Allen (baseball) =

American baseball player

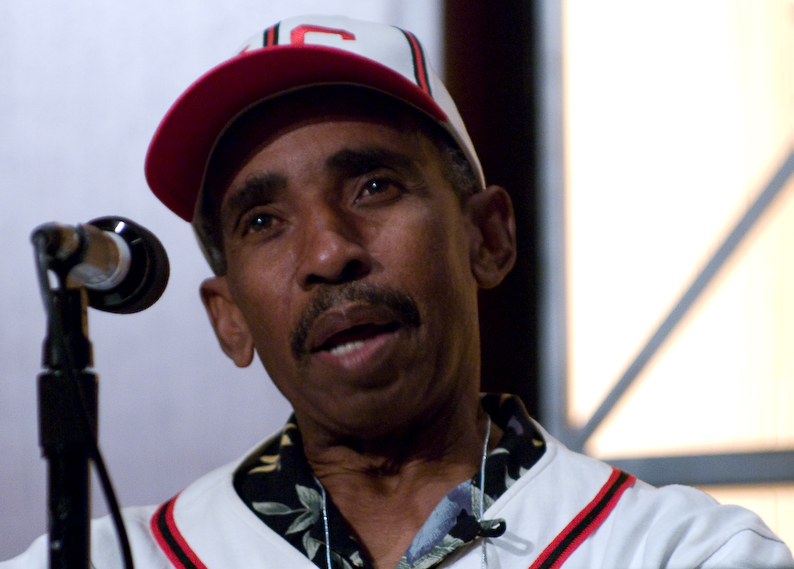
- Allen in 2009
- Outfielder
- Born: April 25, 1936 (age 90); Norfolk, Virginia, U.S.

Teams
- Kansas City Monarchs (1957); Raleigh Tigers (1958); Memphis Red Sox (1959)

Samuel Allen (born April 25, 1936) is an American former professional baseball player for the Negro leagues. Allen was born in 1936 in Norfolk, Virginia. During his high school years at Booker T. Washington High School he was a baseball and football player. In 1957, he played for the Kansas City Monarchs and led the league in runs scored. In 1958, he played for the Raleigh Tigers. In 1959, he played for the Memphis Red Sox. He was drafted into the US Army in 1960. For a period he was with the Army 82nd Airborne.

== Honors ==
- 2003, elected into the African American Hall of Fame
- 2003, Hampton Roads African American Sports Hall of Fame
- 2007, White House Honoree
- 2019, Inductee of the Tidewater Baseball Shrine at Harbor Parker in Norfolk
- 2021, Virginia House of Delegates resolution acknowledging accomplishments
