= Granby roll =

The Granby roll is a wrestling reversal named for Granby High School in Norfolk, Virginia, where it was popularized by coach Billy Martin, Sr. The move can also be utilized in Brazilian jiu-jitsu.

A Granby roll is performed from an inferior position, usually when the top wrestler has a hold upon the lower wrestler's waist from the side or when moving to "take the back." The bottom wrestler rises slightly and cross steps under his own body, using it to post as they kick high with the other leg and perform a shoulder roll to the inside shoulder, achieving either an escape or a reversal with possible back points on the other wrestler.
