= Granby Township, Newton County, Missouri =

Township in Newton County, Missouri, U.S.

Coordinates: 36.9006°N 94.2631°W

Granby Township is an inactive township in Newton County, in the U.S. state of Missouri.

Granby Township took its name from the community of Granby, Missouri.
