= Michael Basnight =

American football player (born 1977)

No. 38
- Position: Running back

Personal information
- Born: September 3, 1977 (age 49); Norfolk, Virginia, U.S.
- Listed height: 6 ft 1 in (1.85 m)
- Listed weight: 235 lb (107 kg)

Career information
- High school: Booker T. Washington (Norfolk)
- College: North Carolina A&T
- NFL draft: 1999: undrafted

Career history
- Cincinnati Bengals (1999–2000); Houston Texans (2002)*
- * Offseason or practice squad member only
- Stats at Pro Football Reference

Michael J. Basnight (born September 3, 1977) is an American former professional football running back who played one season with the Cincinnati Bengals of the National Football League (NFL). He played college football at North Carolina Agricultural and Technical State University.

== Early life ==
Michael J. Basnight was born on September 3, 1977, in Norfolk, Virginia. He attended Booker T. Washington High School in Norfolk.

== College career ==
Basnight played for the North Carolina A&T Aggies, rushing for a career total of 2,544 yards. He won the Jake Gaither Award, given to the nation's best player from a historically black college, his senior season in 1998. He graduated with a Bachelor of Science in Art Design.

== Professional career ==
Basnight signed with the Cincinnati Bengals after going undrafted in the 1999 NFL draft. He played in thirteen games, starting one, for the Bengals during the 1999 season. He was released by the Bengals on August 27, 2001.

Basnight signed with the Houston Texans on December 29, 2001. He was released by the Texans on April 23, 2002.
