= Norfolk 17 =

African-American students admitted to all-white schools in 1959

Norfolk 17 was a group of African American students in Norfolk, Virginia, who were admitted to all-white schools on February 2, 1959.

== Background ==
In April 1951, African American students protested outside of their school in Farmville, Virginia, for better education to escape the horrible conditions they had been enduring at school. Exactly thirty days after their protest, the NAACP filed a lawsuit to end segregation on May 23, 1951. It took three years after that for the U.S. Supreme Court to rule in Brown v. Board of Education stating that segregation in schools was unconstitutional. On August 27, 1956, Governor Thomas B. Stanley created the Stanley Plan which threatened to stop funding for schools who planned to integrate students. Realizing this was unruly, District Court Judge Walter E. Hoffman ruled that black students were required to be admitted into all-white schools in order to abide by the 1954 Brown v. Board of Education case that overturned the concept of "separate but equal".

Opponents to integration in Virginia also attempted to enact Massive Resistance, a strategy declared by Senator Harry F. Byrd and supported by Virginia Governor J. Lindsay Almond Jr. and Norfolk Mayor Kevin Duckworth, all of whom were influential politicians at the time. They anticipated federal integration of schools by threatening a law that any school in Virginia would close automatically if they forced to integrate by the federal government. Norfolk was one of six communities that was impacted by this event, which involved school closings. This displaced 10,000 students and was considered the largest school closing in Virginia.

== Norfolk 17 ==
The Norfolk segregationist school board eventually relented and made a decision to admit African American students if they were able to pass an admissions exam and go through entrance interviews. A reported 151 students took and failed the exam and it was not until later that the students discovered that they were being tested on topics that were one to three grades above their current level. Judge Hoffman expressed disbelief that all of the students failed the exam and demanded that some be admitted. As a result of this ruling seventeen students were admitted into all-white schools on February 2, 1959. They were prepared before attending the schools to expect what was to come and were given instructions on what to do if they experienced actions such as being spit on or pushed down stairs. The principal of the First Baptist Church also helped tutor the students so they were familiar with the same lessons that were taught to the white students.

Upon arriving at their respective schools on the first day the students experienced a mob of white people throwing projectiles at them and taking pictures. Police were called to protect them, however the officers only prevented the mob from throwing logs and stones, while ignoring that the students were being pelted with sticks and pebbles. The Norfolk 17 have described the school environments as "hell", stating that they were spit on, knocked down stairs, and had personal belongings destroyed. They were also instructed to sit by the door in case they needed to escape easily and to sit at the front of the class where the teacher could see if one of their peers did something to them. Their fellow students would also cover up their faces as the African-American students entered the room. Despite being met with hostility, the Norfolk 17 stated that they did not miss a day of school and that they endured the pain everyday to ensure that desegregation would happen.

== Graduation and legacy ==
After graduation several members of the group went on to earn their PhD and some, such as Andrew Heidelberg, wrote books about their experiences. They also advocate in order to keep the group's legacy active. In February 2019 the city of Norfolk celebrated the 60th anniversary of The Norfolk 17 and their admission into all-white schools in Norfolk, Virginia.

== Members ==
Norfolk 17	Name	School Attended
	Louis Cousins	Maury High
	Olivia Driver	Norview High
	LaVera Forbes	Norview Jr. High
	Patricia Godbolt	Norview High
	Alvarez Fredrick Gonsouland	Norview High
	Andrew Heidelberg	Norview High
	Delores Johnson	Norview High
	Edward Jordan	Norview Jr. High
	Lolita Portis	Blair Jr. High
	Betty Jean Reed	Granby High
	Johnnie Rouse	Norview High
	Geraldine Talley	North Side Jr. High
	James Turner Jr.	Norview Jr. High
	Patricia Turner	Norview Jr. High
	Carol Wellington	Norview Jr. High
	Claudia Wellington	Norview Jr. High
	Reginald Young	Blair Jr. High
