= Norfolk Public Schools =

School district in Virginia, United States

Location
- 800 East City Hall Avenue; Norfolk, Virginia 23510 United States

District information
- Type: Public
- Motto: Nationally recognized. Globally competitive.
- Grades: PreK-12
- Superintendent: Dr. Sharon Byrdsong
- Accreditation: Virginia Department of Education
- Schools: 34 elementary, 9 middle, 5 high, 16 auxiliary programs/other facilities
- NCES District ID: 5102670

Students and staff
- Students: About 26,000 students(2023–24 school year)
- Teachers: About 2,590 (FTE)

Other information
- Mission: The Cornerstone of a Proudly Diverse Community
- Website: www.npsk12.com

The Norfolk Public Schools, also known as Norfolk City Public Schools, are the school division responsible for public education in the United States city of Norfolk, Virginia.

== History ==
In 2019 Sharon Byrdsong became the interim superintendent, and in 2020 the designated superintendent. In 2022 she got a term renewal until 2026, with five board members supporting and two board members opposing.

== List of schools ==
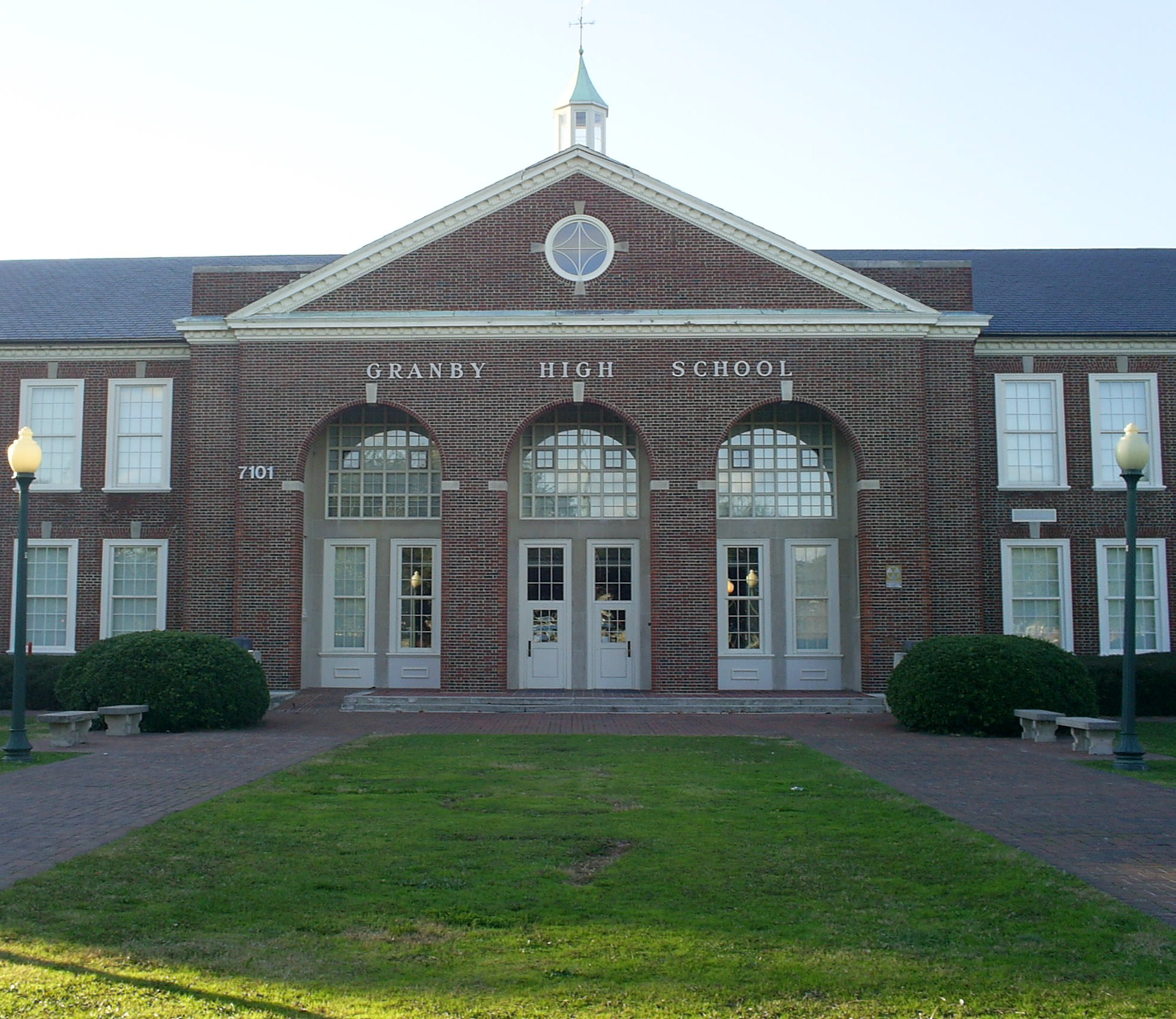
Granby High School, 2007

High schools
Booker T. Washington High School	1111 Park Avenue
Granby High School	7101 Granby Street
Lake Taylor High School	1384 Kempsville Road
Matthew Fontaine Maury High School	322 Shirley Avenue
Norview High School	6501 Chesapeake Boulevard

Middle schools
Academy of International Studies at Rosemont	1330 Branch Road
Azalea Gardens Middle School	7721 Azalea Garden Road
James Blair Middle School	730 Spotswood Avenue
Northside Middle School	8720 Granby Street
Norview Middle School	6325 Sewells Point Road
Ruffner Academy	610 May Avenue

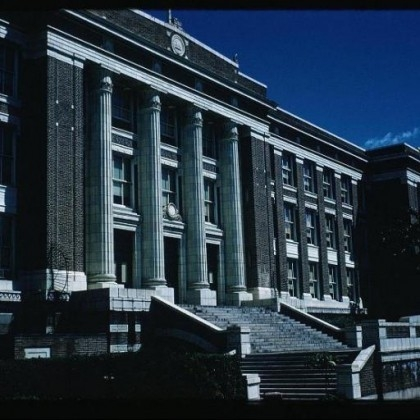
Maury High School, 1961

Elementary schools
Academy for Discovery at Lakewood (3-8)	1701 Alsace Avenue
Bay View Elementary School	1434 East Bayview Boulevard
Camp Allen Elementary School	501 C Street
Chesterfield Academy	2915 Westminster Boulevard
Coleman Place Elementary School	2445 Palmyra Street
Crossroads School (Pre-K-8)	8021 Old Ocean View Road
Ghent School (K-8)	200 Shirley Avenue
Granby Elementary School	7101 Newport Avenue
Ingleside Elementary School	976 Ingleside Avenue
Jacox Elementary School	1300 Marshall Avenue
James Monroe Elementary School	520 West 29th Street
Lake Taylor School (3-8)	1380 Kempsville Road
Larchmont Elementary School	1145 Bolling Avenue
Larrymore Elementary School	7600 Halprin Drive
Lindenwood Elementary School	2700 Ludlow Street
Little Creek Elementary School	7900 Tarpon Place
Mary Calcott Elementary School	137 East Westmont Avenue
Ocean View Elementary School	9501 Mason Creek Road
Oceanair Elementary School closed permanently in June 2026 and will be an Early Childhood Education Center in the upcoming school year	600 Dudley Avenue
P. B. Young Sr. Elementary School	543 East Olney Road
Richard Bowling Elementary School	2700 East Princess Anne Road
Sewells Point Elementary School	7928 Hampton Boulevard
Sherwood Forest Elementary School	3035 Sherwood Forest Lane
Southside STEM Academy at Campostella	1106 Campostella Road
St. Helena Elementary School	903 South Main Street
Suburban Park Elementary School	310 Thole Street
Tanners Creek Elementary School	1335 Longdale Drive
Tarrallton Elementary School	2080 Tarrallton Drive
W. H. Taylor Elementary School	1122 West Princess Anne Road
Willard Model Elementary School	1511 Willow Wood Drive
Auxiliary programs/other facilities
ACCESS College Foundation	7300 Newport Avenue, Suite 500
Berkley/Campostella Childhood Center	1530 Cypress Street
Camp E. W. Young	145 Deepwater Drive, Chesapeake, VA
Easton Preschool	6405 Curlew Drive
Granby High Evening School	7101 Granby Street
Grandy Village Learning Center	2971 Kimball Loop
Hospital Program at CHKD	601 Children's Lane
Madison Alternative Center	3700 Bowdens Ferry Road
NET Academy	1260 Security Lane
Norfolk Technical Vocational Center	1330 North Military Highway
NORSTAR/Robotics Program at NTC	1330 North Military Highway
NPS Open Campus	1025 Widgeon Road
NTC Evening School	1330 North Military Highway
Oceanair ECC	600 Dudley Avenue
Rosemont Annex	7000 West Tanners Creek Road
SECEP	6160 Kempsville Circle, Suite 300B

Larchmont Elementary, in the Larchmont neighborhood, also takes students from the Highland Park and Lamberts Point neighborhoods. The current building of Larchmont Elementary opened in 2017. The school, previously known as Larchmont School and at one time having middle school grades, began in October 1913. Originally a part of the Tanner’s Creek School Board, it became a part of the Norfolk school district after Norfolk annexed the area on January 1, 1923. Its original building later became a part of the College of William and Mary. This building, after the transfer to the college, was the administrative offices up until 1936. In 1930 Larchmont School's next building opened, and in 1954 an addition with six classrooms had opened.

Sewell's Point Elementary School was named after the landmark Sewell's Point, which in turn was named after Henry Seawell. Sewell's Point Elementary is the zoned elementary school for on-property dependents living on the grounds of Joint Forces Staff College.

== See also ==
- Broussard v. School Board of Norfolk
