= John T. West School =

- Formerly listed on the U.S. National Register of Historic Places
- Virginia Landmarks Register
- Location: 1425 Bolton Street, Norfolk, Virginia
- Area: 2 acres (0.81 ha)
- Built: 1906
- Architect: Zepp, William T.; Harper, Charles F., et al.
- Architectural style: Colonial Revival
- NRHP reference No.: 00000315
- VLR No.: 122-0004

Significant dates
- Added to NRHP: March 31, 2000
- Designated VLR: December 1, 1999
- Removed from NRHP: September 27, 2006
- Delisted VLR: June 19, 2008

John T. West School, also known as Tanner's Creek School No. 4 and Barborsville School, was a historic school for African-American students located in Norfolk, Virginia. It was built in 1906, and was a two-story, Colonial Revival style brick building with a hipped roof. In 1913, it was doubled in size with an addition to the south and connected via a two-story ell. A one-story brick cafeteria was added in 1950, followed by a music room around 1960. In 1911, the building hosted the first public African-American high school classes in the city of Norfolk. It continued holding elementary school classes until its closure in 1980. It was demolished in August 2006.

It was listed on the National Register of Historic Places in 2000 and delisted in 2006.
