= Granby High School =

Public school in Virginia, United States

Coordinates: 36°54′25.9″N 76°16′37.7″W

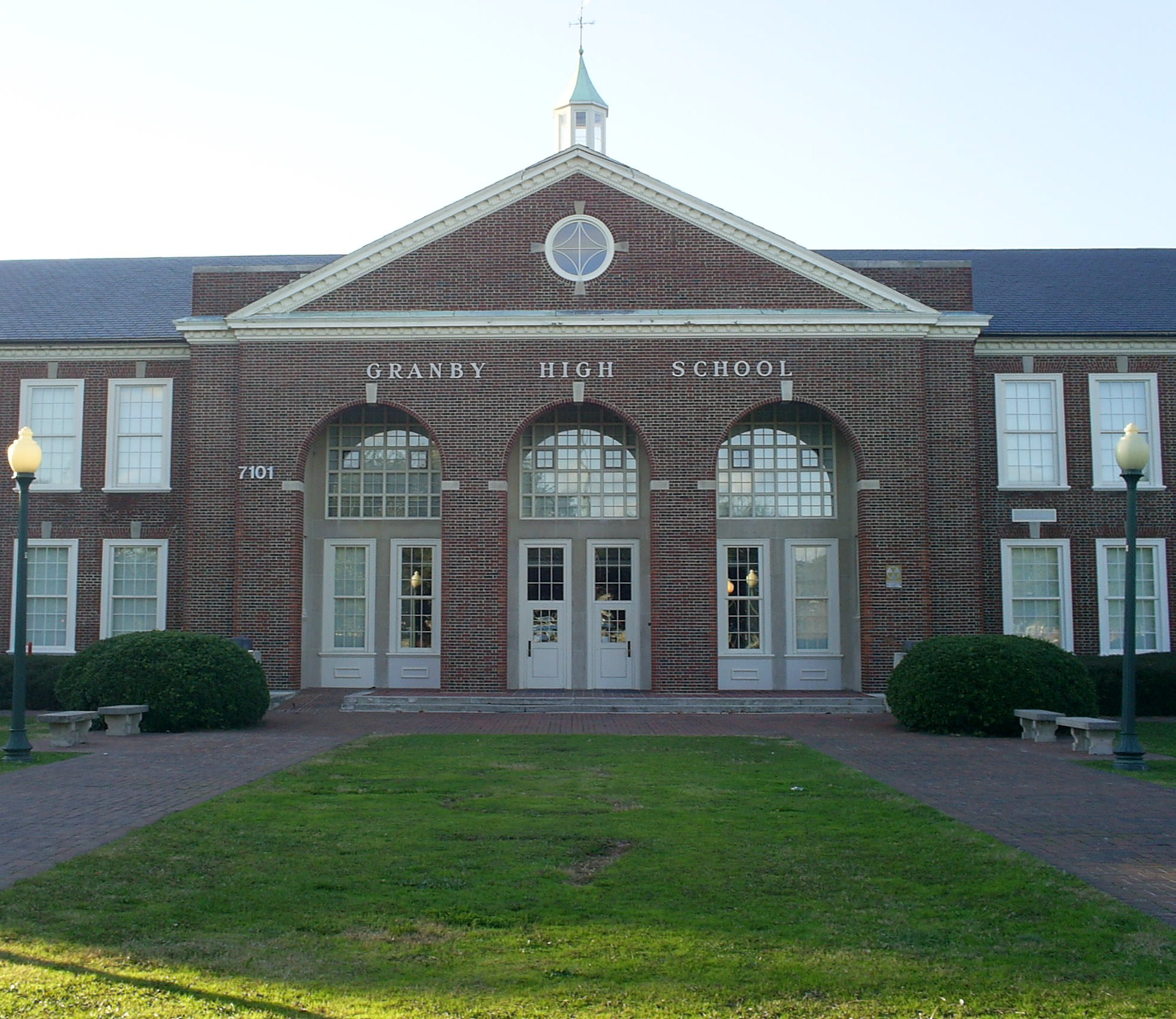

Location
- 7101 Granby Street; Norfolk, Virginia 23505; United States

Information
- Former name: Granby Street High School
- School type: Public, high school
- Motto: Ad astra per aspera ("through hardships to the stars")
- Founded: 1939; 87 years ago
- School district: Norfolk Public Schools
- Principal: Thomas R. Smigiel Jr.
- Teaching staff: 131.56 (FTE) (2021-22)
- Grades: 9–12
- Enrollment: 1,863 (2021-22)
- Student to teacher ratio: 14.16 (2021-22)
- Campus: Urban (midsize)
- Colors: Silver; Gold; Blue
- Athletics conference: Virginia High School League (Eastern District)
- Team name: Comets
- Rival: Maury High School
- Communities served: Ocean View; Willoughby Spit; Talbot Park; Wards Corner; Colonial Place; Park Place; Titustown
- Website: Official website

Plaque in front of Granby High.

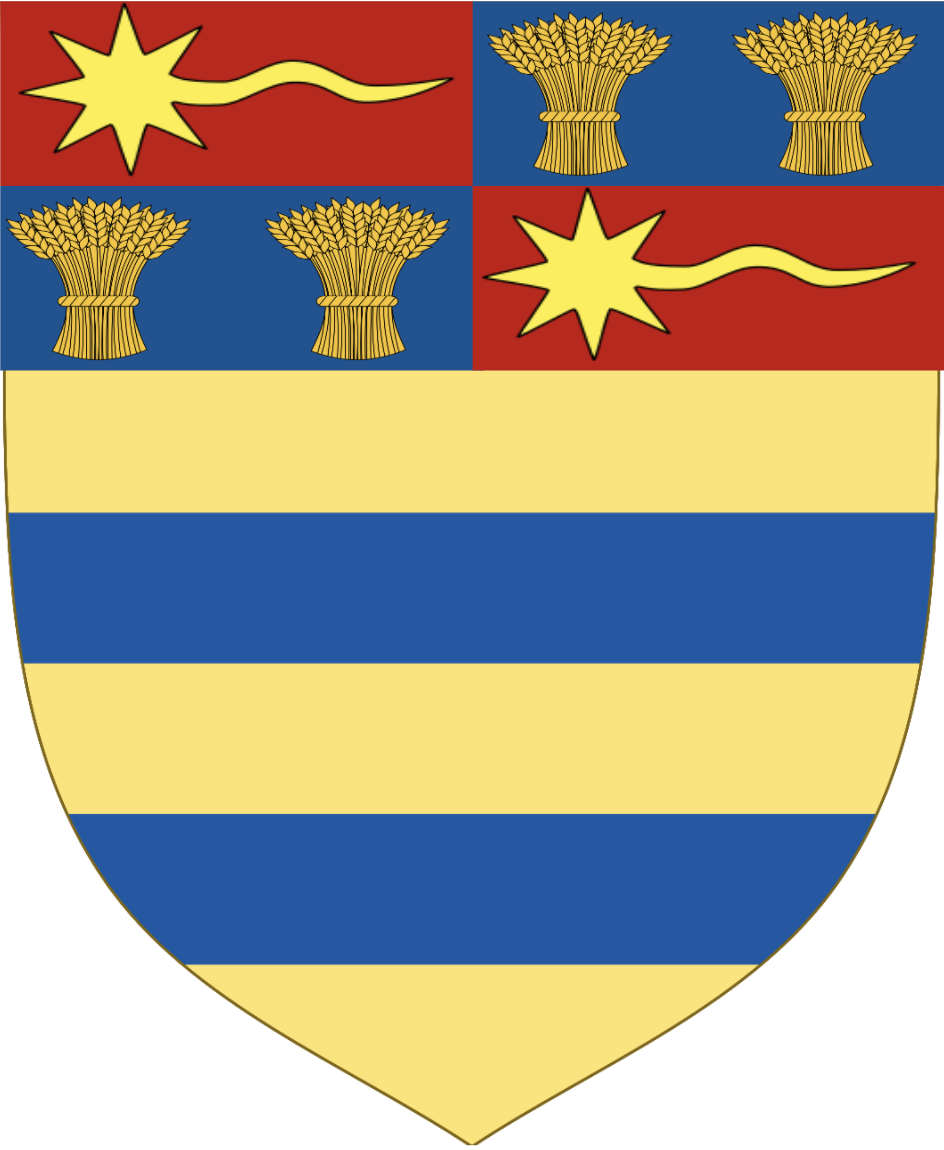
An archaic coat of arms granted to Granby High School, and it is no longer in use.

Two Granby defenders break up a pass from Great Bridge's quarterback at Granby's Powhatan Field.

Granby's Field Hockey Team at a match against Cox High School.

Granby High School (originally Granby Street High School) is a public high school in Norfolk, Virginia. The school is part of the Norfolk Public Schools system. It is the only high school in the school division that offers an International Baccalaureate program. The school building is located on historic Granby Street where the south end is at Downtown Norfolk and the north end where the beaches of Ocean View lie. Granby is also less than a mile away from the historic Wards Corner, a local shopping and eating center. In 2010, Newsweek placed Granby in the top 1300 of "America's Top Public High Schools". Granby was the only school in Norfolk, VA to place on the list. Granby's mascot is the comet.

== History ==
Opened in 1939, the school was previously known as Granby Street High School, reflecting the street on which it is located. Both the street and the school are named after John Manners, Marquess of Granby and Duke of Rutland, a hero of the Seven Years' War. The twenty-four acre tract on which Granby was built was once part of the Talbot Plantation before the property was donated to the city by Minton W. Talbot.

Navy Blue, Las Vegas Gold, and Silver are the school colors. Blue representing the color of the Chesapeake Bay, which is in Granby's vicinity. The gold and silver are derived from the proverb: "A word fitly spoken is like apples of gold in pictures of silver." This quote is also hung on a plaque in the hallway.

Granby's school symbol is the comet. It also has a newspaper entitled "The Spectator," and annually publishes a literary magazine called "The Cupola," named after the structure on the top of the school's roof. The weathervane on top of the cupola was bent as a result of tropical storm Ernesto but was fixed within six months.

=== "Granby 1" and "Granby 2" ===
In 1996, the school system invested $21 million in a construction project in order to expand and renovate the 57-year-old building. Because of this construction, the entire student body could not stay in the original building. To fix this problem, the 1100 freshmen and sophomores were sent to the former Norfolk Catholic High building a half-mile away from the building. Catholic High was vacant at the time since Catholic High moved to Virginia Beach. The Catholic High building was nicknamed "Granby 2" while the original building was "Granby 1." Under Principal Michael Caprio, the school had to double everything including scheduling, busing, orientation, and lunches. Several headaches later, the 20,000-square-foot (1,900 m^{2}) expansion was complete with a comprehensive voice, video, and high-speed data network and a media resource management system for 110 classrooms and laboratories. In addition, the building gained two multimedia presentation rooms and an innovative CCTV security system.

== International Baccalaureate Program ==
Granby High School is the only high school in the Norfolk Public Schools system that offers the International Baccalaureate Program, or IB, abbreviated. Granby currently has both the Career Programme as well as the Dimploma Programme. Both programs are a two-year academically rigorous curriculum intended for juniors and seniors. The Diploma Programme is for those students who desire in-depth scholastic preparation for college or university. The Career Programme is for those students who wish to enter into the workforce or pursue college or university afterward.

== Sports at Granby High ==
Granby High School offers a variety of sports as it is a member of the AAA Eastern Region of the Virginia High School League. Comets compete in the AAA Eastern District which is composed of the five Norfolk high schools and the three Portsmouth high schools. The sports offered at Granby include:

- Baseball, Junior Varsity
- Baseball, Varsity
- Basketball, Boys
- Basketball, Girls
- Basketball, Junior Varsity, Boys
- Basketball, Junior Varsity, Girls
- Cheerleader, Junior Varsity
- Cheerleaders, Varsity
- Crew
- Cross Country
- Field Hockey
- Football
- Golf
- Sailing (combination of students from Granby, Maury High School, and Saint Patrick Catholic School)
- Soccer, Boys
- Soccer, Girls
- Softball
- Softball Junior Varsity
- Swimming, Boys
- Swimming, Girls
- Table tennis
- Tennis, Boys
- Tennis, Girls
- Track, Indoor
- Track, Outdoor
- Volleyball, Boys
- Volleyball, Girls
- Wrestling—Wrestling coach Billy Martin's teams won 21 state titles in 22 seasons at Granby High from 1949 to 1970. In the decade of the 1960s, Granby lost only two matches. Martin's most famous invention was the "Granby roll", a move that used an opponent's aggressiveness against him. It became the basis of the "Granby System," which is still taught today. He was elected to the National Wrestling Hall of Fame in 1980, one of the first high school coaches inducted.

== Granby Distant Galaxy ==
Comets at the ACCs in 2006.

Granby High School is home to the "Distant Galaxy," an award-winning marching band currently led by Mr. Steven Smalts. A Hampton Roads local, Norfolk State University graduate, member of the Spartan Legion, and former captain of the Million Dollar Funk Squad, his passion is for the artistic and professional development of up-and-coming musicians and young leaders.

== Notable alumni ==
- John E. Blaha – astronaut
- Peter Blair – Olympic freestyle wrestler, competed at the 1956 Summer Olympics
- Levi Brown – former NFL offensive tackle
- Keyshawn Davis – Olympic Lightweight boxer, competed at the 2020 Summer Olympics
- Lefty Driesell – former college basketball coach
- Hank Foiles – former MLB catcher
- Grant Gustin – actor, played in shows Glee and The Flash
- Erika Renee Land – author
- Dexter Reid – former NFL safety and two-time Super Bowl champion
- Nick Rerras – former politician
- Chuck Stobbs – former MLB pitcher
- Scott Travis – Grammy award winning American rock musician, drummer
- David Whitaker - politician
- R. Steven Whitcomb – 63rd Inspector General of the United States Army
- Terrance Woodbury – professional basketball player

== Notable former teachers and staff ==
- Bob Tata – retired long-time member of the Virginia House of Delegates, coached football at Granby

== See also ==
- Granby Street
- John Manners, Marquess of Granby
