= Churchland High School =

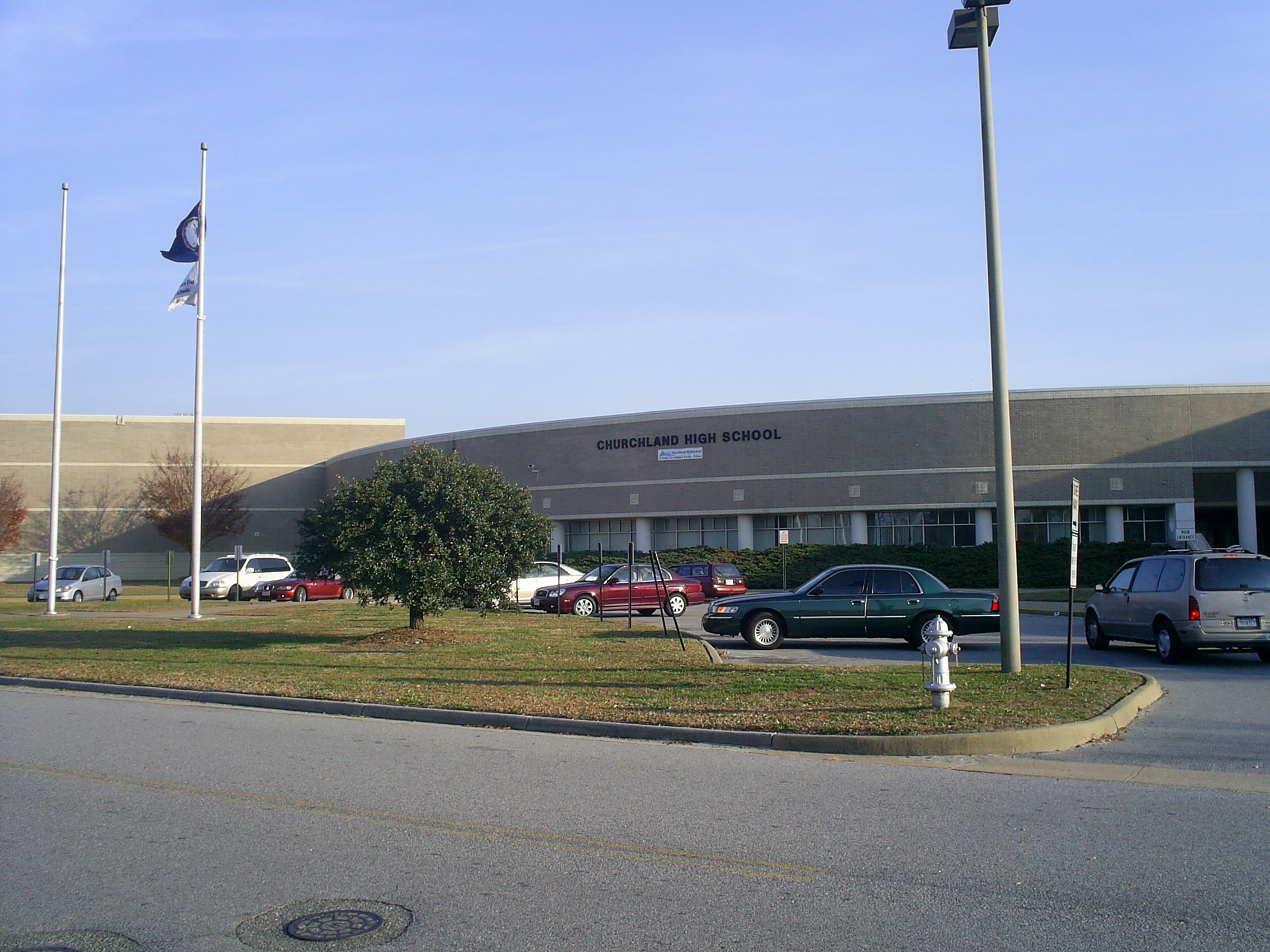

Location
- 4301 Cedar Lane; Portsmouth, Virginia 23703; United States; 36°52′49.5″N 76°22′17.4″W

Information
- School type: Public, high school
- Founded: 1840
- School district: Portsmouth Public Schools
- Superintendent: Elie Bracy III
- Principal: Jennelle Burden
- Grades: 9–12
- Enrollment: 1,452 (2023–24)
- Campus: Suburban
- Colors: Black and Orange
- Athletics conference: Virginia High School League; Class 4 Region A Eastern District
- Mascot: Truckers
- Website: chs.ppsk12.us

Churchland High School is a public high school in Portsmouth, Virginia in the United States. It is administered by Portsmouth Public Schools. The school colors are black and orange. The mascot is a "Trucker".

Churchland is designated as a magnet school for the visual and performing arts, with subjects including dance, chorus, orchestra, band, drama, and the visual arts.

== Sports ==
On January 21, 2023, a 22-year-old junior varsity assistant basketball coach impersonated a 13-year-old player during a game against Nansemond River High School. The coaches for the junior varsity team were fired after an investigation into the incident. The girls and junior varsity teams voted not to continue with their season and will forfeit future games.

== Notable alumni ==
- Richard Thomas Shea (1927–1953), posthumous recipient of the Medal of Honor (1953), Virginia Tech track star
- W. Nathaniel "Nat" Howell (1939–2020), State Department Foreign Service officer, former ambassador to Kuwait; professor emeritus, the University of Virginia
- L. Glenn Perry (1944–1998), first Chief Accountant of the United States Securities and Exchange Commission
- Denny Riddleberger (born 1945), former MLB player (Washington Senators, Cleveland Indians)
- Ryan Glynn (born 1974), former Major League Baseball (MLB) player (Texas Rangers, Toronto Blue Jays, Oakland Athletics)
- Arthur Moats (born 1988), National Football League linebacker (Buffalo Bills, Pittsburgh Steelers)
- Da'Quan Felton (born 2001), NFL wide receiver for the New York Giants
- Charles Grant (born 2002), NFL offensive tackle for the Las Vegas Raiders
- Brandyn Hillman (born 2005), college football safety for the Virginia Cavaliers
