= Ferry Plantation House =

Historic house in Virginia, United States

- U.S. National Register of Historic Places
- Virginia Landmarks Register
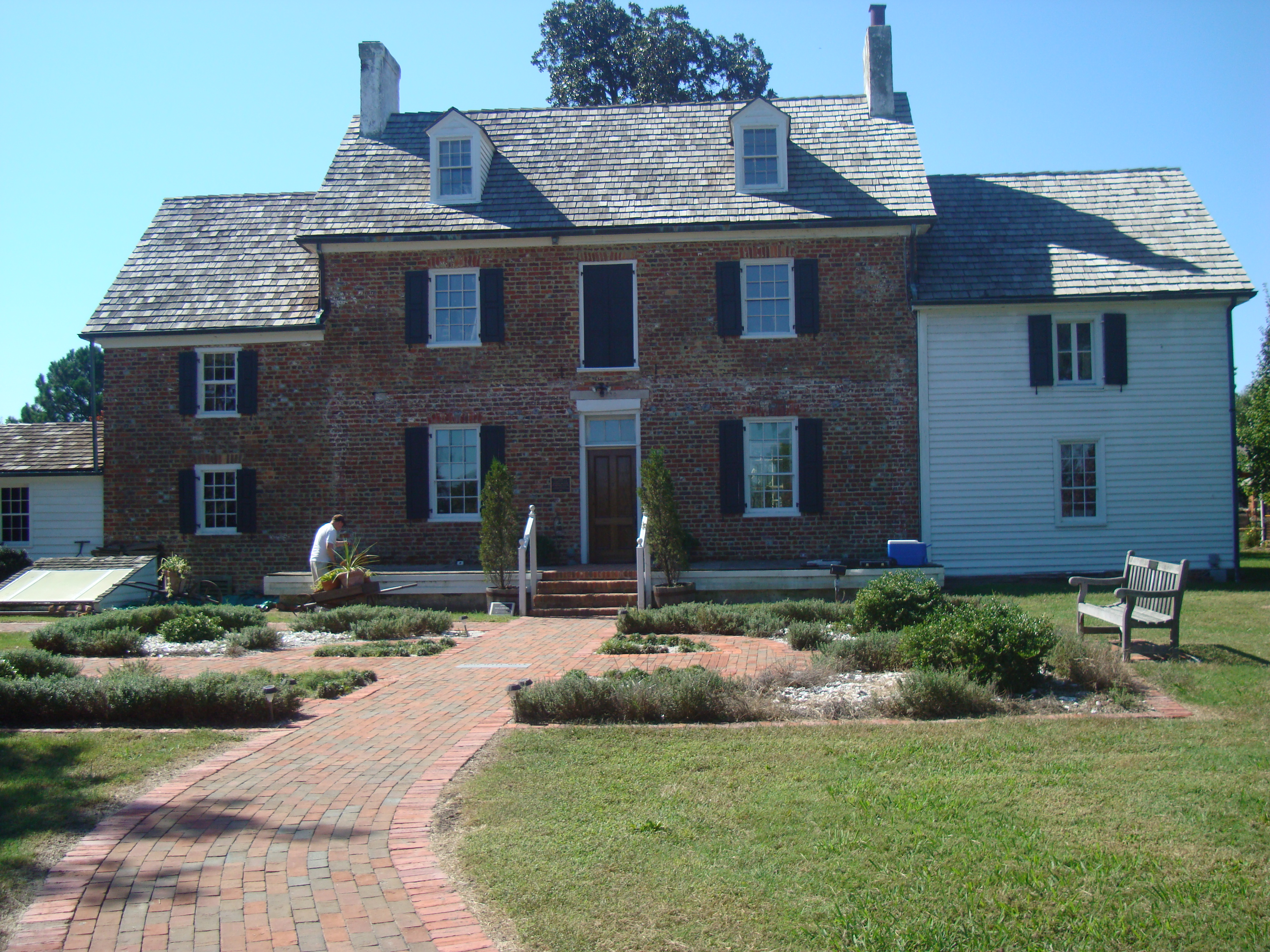
- Ferry Plantation House

- Location within Virginia Location within the United States
- Location: 4136 Cheswick Lane; Virginia Beach, Virginia
- Coordinates: 36°51′50″N 76°7′6″W
- Built: 1830
- Architect: McIntosh, George
- Architectural style: Federal
- NRHP reference No.: 04001545
- VLR No.: 134-0011

Significant dates
- Added to NRHP: January 20, 2005
- Designated VLR: December 1, 2004, July 20, 2005

Ferry Plantation House, or Old Donation Farm, Ferry Farm, Walke Manor House, is a brick house in the neighborhood of Old Donation Farm in Virginia Beach, Virginia. The site dates back to 1642 when Savill Gaskin started the second ferry service in Hampton Roads to carry passengers on the Lynnhaven River to the nearby county courthouse and to visit plantations along the waterway. A cannon was used to signal the ferry, which had 11 total stops along the river. The first ferry service was started nearby by Adam Thoroughgood.

The house, which is reputedly haunted by 11 spirits, has been used as a plantation, courthouse, school, and post office. It is currently a museum and educational center. A Summer History Camp, which educates youths about life in the 18th and 19th centuries, is also held on the site.

== Description ==
The area was initially cleared by the local Indians in the 16th century and many of their artifacts have been found on the site. The third Princess Anne County courthouse, the first brick courthouse in the county, was built on this site, complete with stocks and pillory. This third courthouse was in existence from 1735 until the construction of the Walke Mansion. The Walke Mansion (1751-1828), owned by William Walke, was destroyed by fire on September 12, 1828. Walke may have run a tavern here during the American Revolution.

The current house was built in 1830. Its exterior is Federal style three-course American bond brickwork; all of the bricks were from the ruins of the Walke Mansion. A West Bay addition was built in 1850. The house has 10 rooms with heart-of-pine flooring and several original features. It was once covered with oyster shell stucco. The rear of the home faces the western branch of the Lynnhaven River.

The house occupies 0.1 acres (0.040 ha) owned by the city and is encompassed by 2 acres (0.81 ha) of open space owned by a homeowners association. There are some small gardens on the property and in the back yard is a large southern magnolia planted on April 6, 1863, by Sally Rebecca Walke in memory of her fiancé.

=== Renovation ===
Virginia Higgins moved out of Ferry Plantation in 1986 and turned the deed over to the City of Virginia Beach. The Ferry Plantation House was abandoned from 1986 to 1996. A group of citizens saved the house from demolition around 1996. Investors bought it in 1994, but their deal to sell it fell through in 1996 when the Virginia Beach City Council said the house could not be a private residence due to deed restrictions. The deed to the property was eventually turned over to the City of Virginia Beach in June 1996, and the Friends of the Ferry Plantation House, Inc. began renovating the house in 1996 in partnership with the City of Virginia Beach. Court House bars (one set and shackles) are still on one window to date.

The house was listed in the Virginia Landmarks Register (Virginia Historic Landmark) in 2004 and the US National Register of Historic Places in 2005 and The +Virginia State Register.

Author Belinda Nash served on the board of directors of the FOFPH.

== Hauntings ==
The house is reportedly haunted by 11 spirits; spirit tours are available, including one during Halloween called "The Stroll of Lost Souls". Reported spirits include those of people who perished in an 1810 ship wreck at the ferry landing, a former slave, Sally Rebecca Walke, who mourns her fiancé, a fallen soldier, and the Lady in White, who reportedly died of a broken neck from falling down the stairs, as well as the artist Thomas Williamson, owner of the Manor House who was married to a Walke has been reported seen at the top of the stairs painting. Paranormal groups come to the house to do research. Sounds of dragging chains have been reported, possibly from the days of the old courthouse.

Grace Sherwood, the "Witch of Pungo", was tried by ducking near here and the museum sponsors the annual Grace Sherwood Festival, which includes viewing of the reenactment of the ducking. The actual ducking of Sherwood was at the end of what is now Witchduck Road, 200 yards out in the river from what is now a private home. The House has a red maple and marker in honor of Sherwood in the side yard.

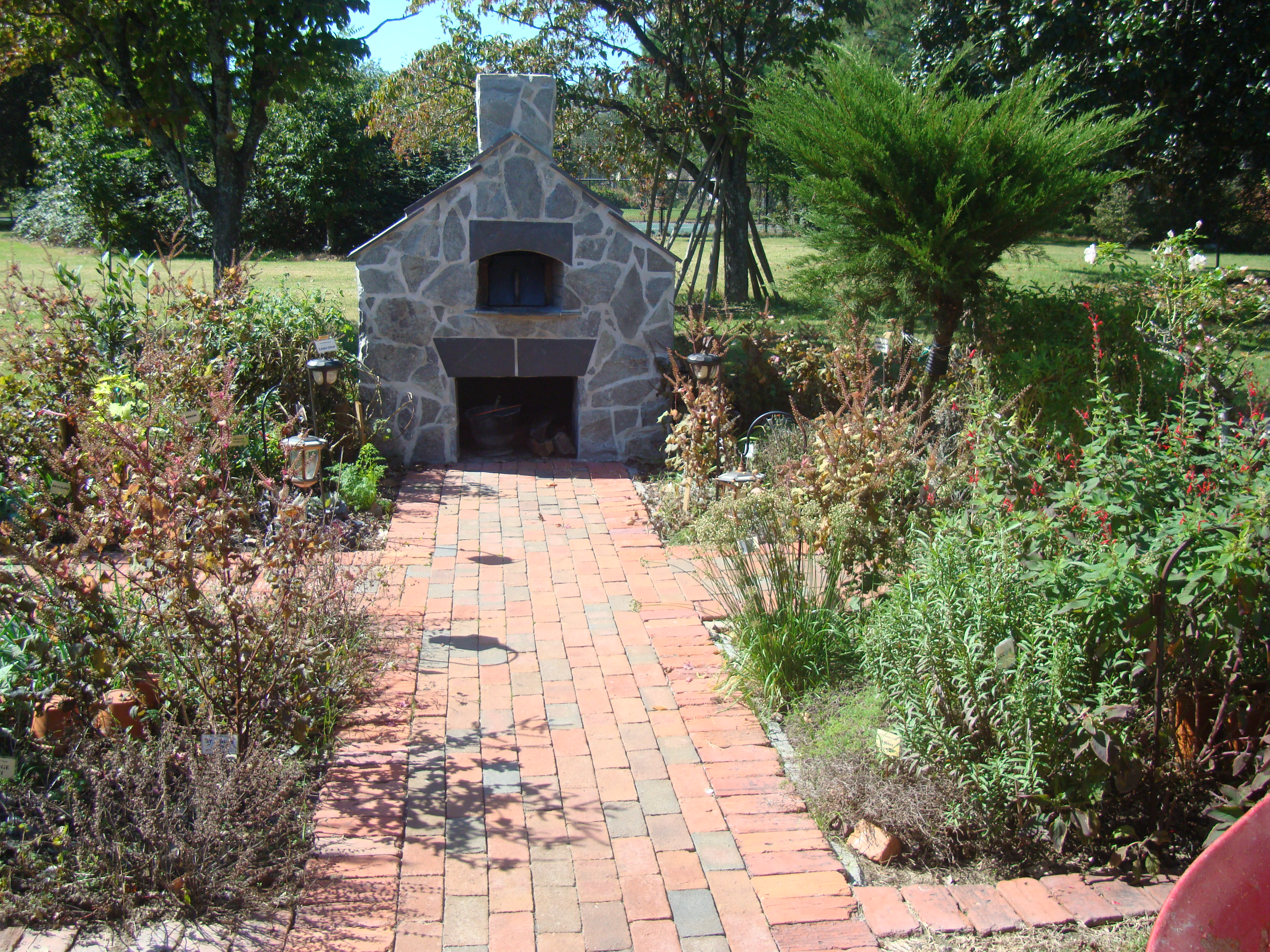
Cooker in rear of the Ferry Plantation House

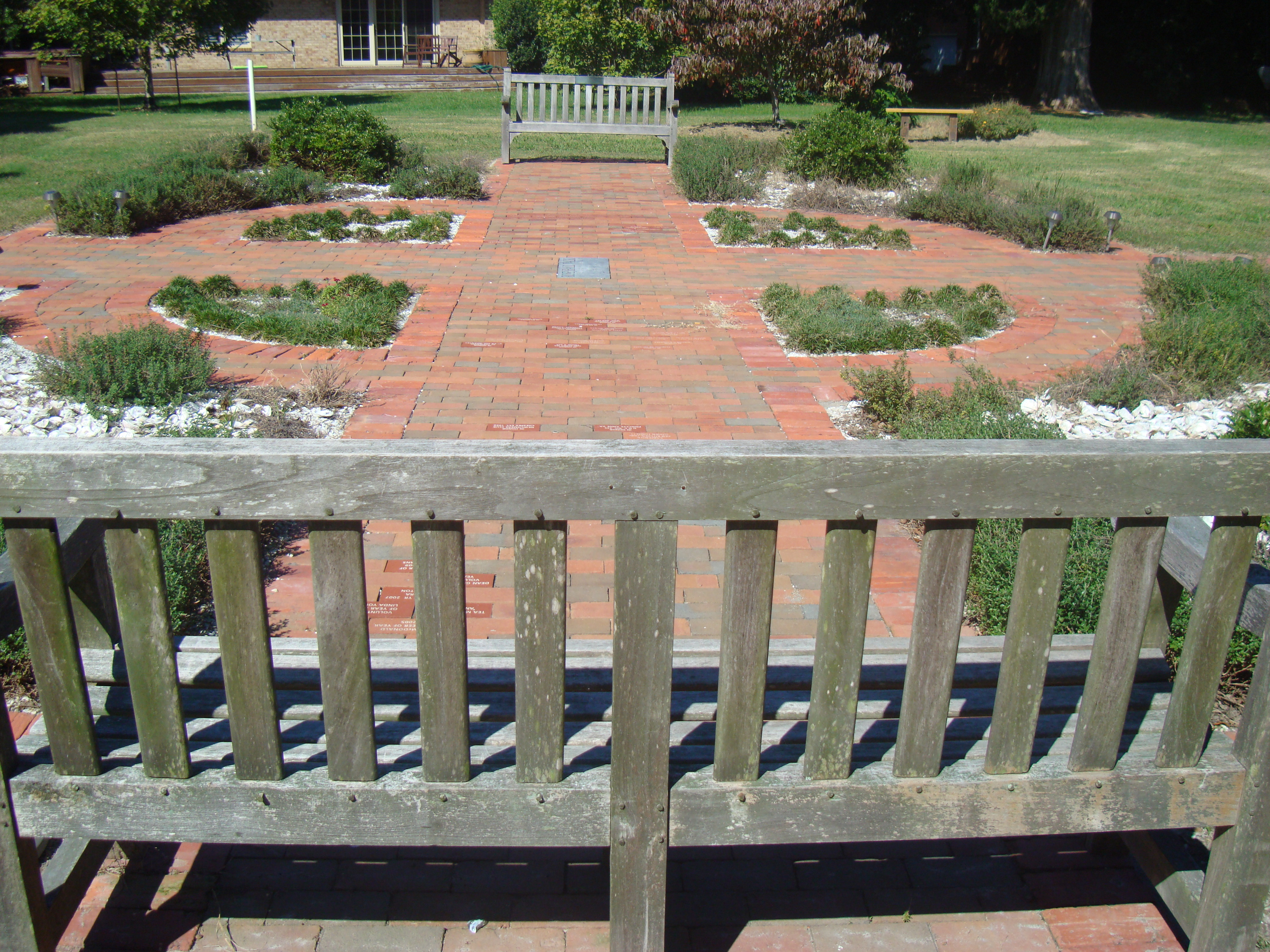
Rose Hall Walk in front of the Ferry Plantation House

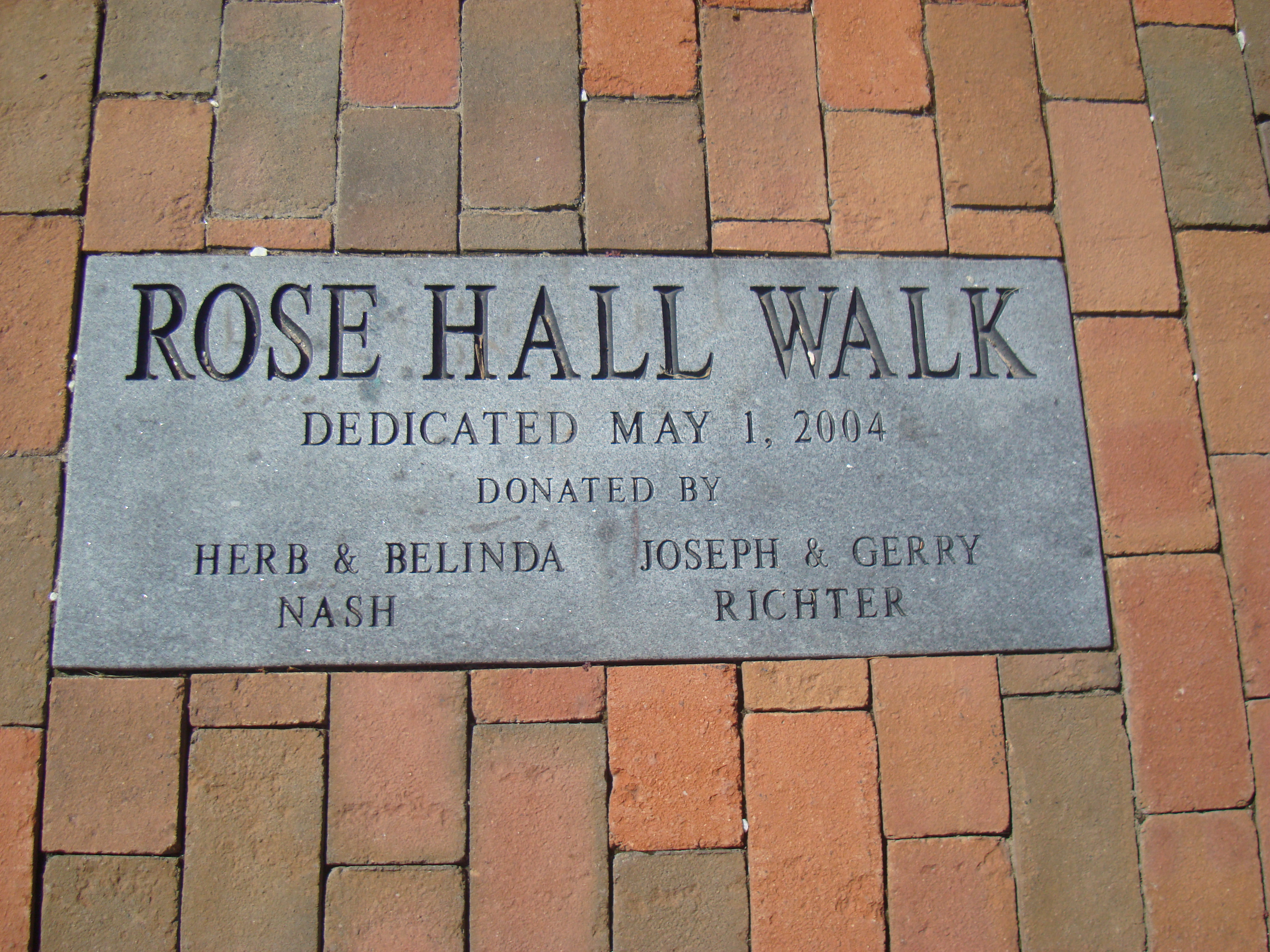
Rose Hall Walk marker in front of the Ferry Plantation House

== See also ==
- List of the oldest buildings in Virginia
- National Register of Historic Places listings in Virginia Beach, Virginia
- List of reportedly haunted locations in the United States
