= L39 =

L39 or L-39 may refer to:

- 60S ribosomal protein L39
- Aero L-39 Albatros, a Czechoslovak jet trainer
- Bell L-39, an American experimental aircraft
- HMS Rockwood (L39), a destroyer of the Royal Navy
- HMS Shearwater (L39), a sloop of the Royal Navy
- Lahti L-39, an anti-tank rifle
- Mitochondrial ribosomal protein L39
- Ramona Airport, in San Diego County, California
