= Virginia Beach (disambiguation) =

Virginia Beach, or variants on the same, may refer to:

- Virginia Beach, Virginia
  - Virginia Beach Town Center
  - Virginia Beach Oceanfront
- Virginia Beach, Virginia metropolitan area (Hampton Roads)
  - Virginia Beach Airport (FAA LID 42VA)
- Virginia Beach Boulevard, a major connector highway in Virginia
- Virginia Beach Expressway, part of the I-264 in Virginia
- Virginia Beach Open, a golf tournament
- 2019 Virginia Beach shooting, a shooting incident on 31 May 2019
- "Virginia Beach" (song)
