= Bell P-63 Kingcobra =

Mid-engined fighter aircraft

P-63 Kingcobra
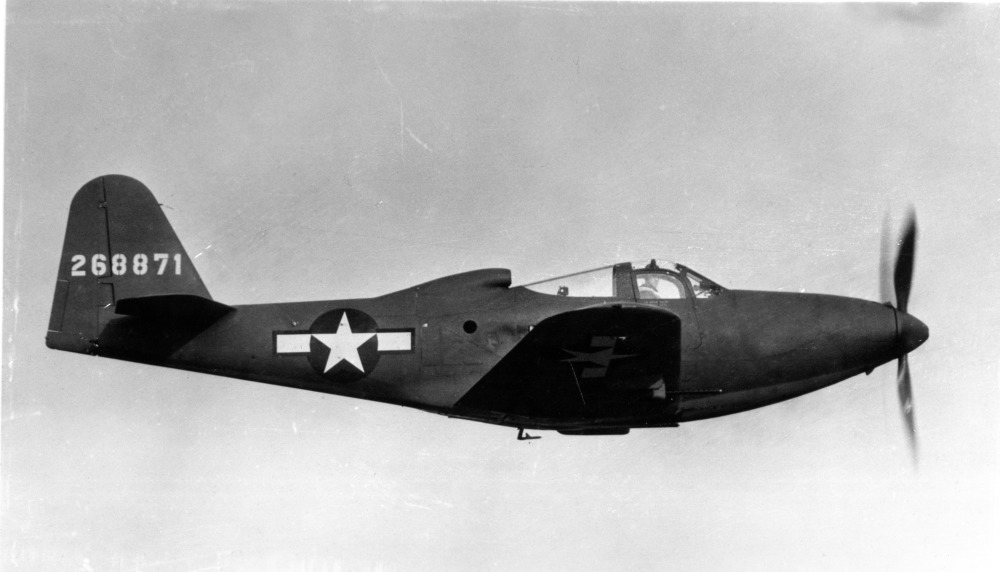

General information
- Type: Fighter aircraft
- National origin: United States
- Manufacturer: Bell Aircraft
- Status: Retired
- Primary users: United States Army Air Forces Soviet Air Force; French Air Force
- Number built: 3,303

History
- Manufactured: 1943–1945
- Introduction date: October 1943
- First flight: 7 December 1942
- Developed from: Bell P-39 Airacobra
- Variant: Bell L-39

The Bell P-63 Kingcobra is an American fighter aircraft that was developed by Bell Aircraft during World War II. Based on the preceding Bell P-39 Airacobra, the P-63's design incorporated suggestions from P-39 pilots and was superior to its predecessor in virtually all respects. The P-63 was not accepted for combat use by the United States Army Air Forces (USAAF). However, it was used during World War II by the Soviet Air Force, which had also been the most prolific user of the P-39.

== Design and development ==
=== XP-39E ===
The P-39 had been introduced as an interceptor, later in its development it was decided to reduce the cost and complexity of the engine by removing the turbocharger. High-altitude performance suffered dramatically as a result, and Bell proposed an experimental series to test out a variety of solutions.

The resulting XP-39E featured two primary changes from the earlier P-39D from which it was developed. One was a redesigned wing. The root airfoil, a NACA 0015 on other models of the P-39, was changed to a NACA 0018, to gain internal volume. The other was a switch to the Continental I-1430 engine, which featured an improved overall design developed from the hyper engine efforts, as well as an improved supercharger.

Three prototypes were ordered in April 1941 with serials 41-19501, 41-19502 and 42-7164. The I-1430 had continued development problems and could not be delivered in time, so it was replaced by an Allison V-1710-47, similar to that powering the P-39. Each prototype tested different wing and tail configurations: 41-19501 had a rounded vertical tail, but squared-off tailplane tips; 41-19502, a squared-off fin and rudder and large wing fillets; and 42-7164 had all its flight surfaces squared off. The XP-39E proved faster than standard Airacobra, reaching a maximum speed of 386 mph (621 km/h) at 21,680 ft (6,610 m) during tests. However, the XP-39E was considered inferior to the stock P-39 Airacobra in all other respects, so it was not ordered into production.

=== XP-63 ===
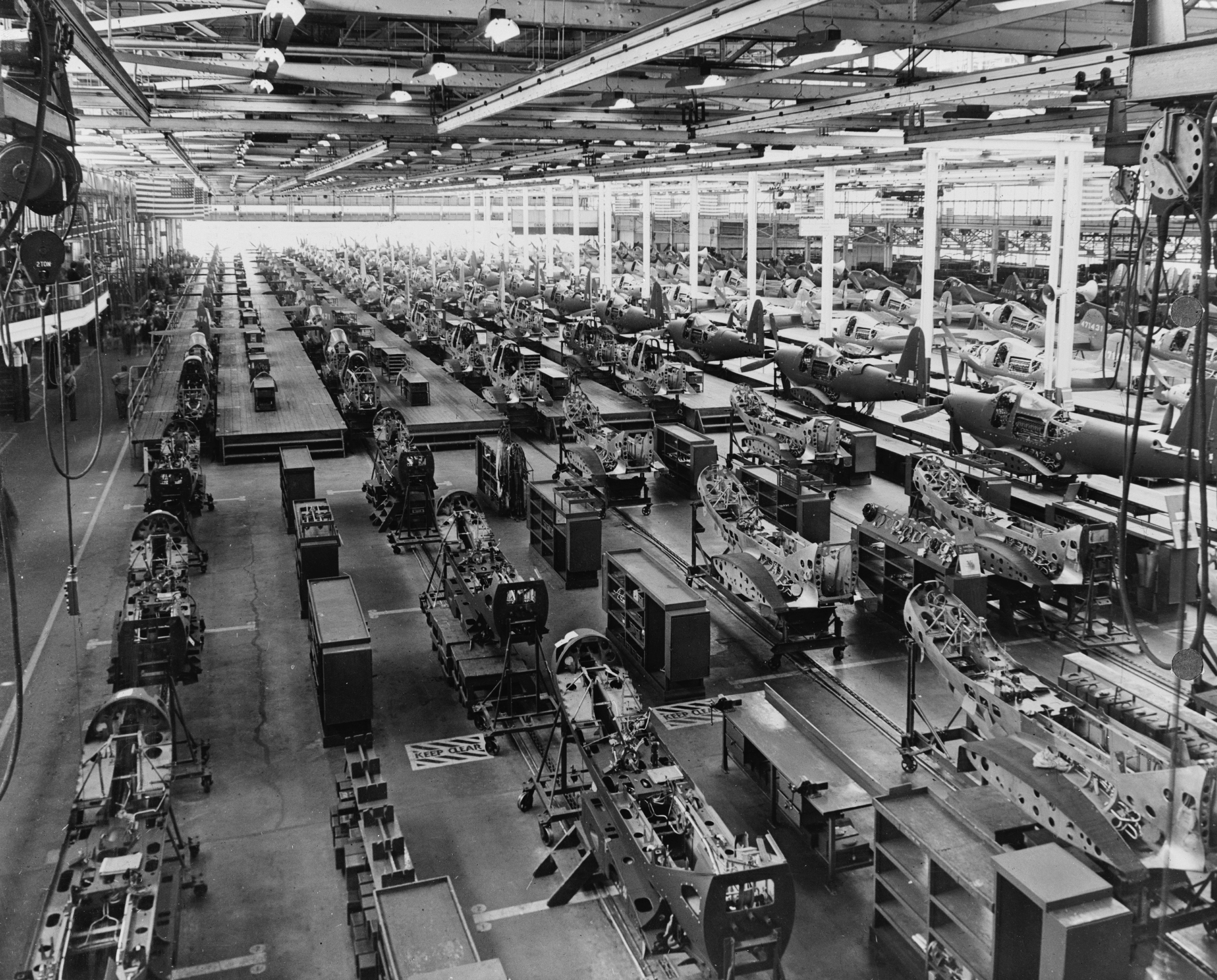
Bell assembly line near Niagara Falls, New York

Although the XP-39E proved disappointing, the USAAF was nevertheless interested in an even larger aircraft based on the same basic layout. Even before its first flight, the USAAF placed an order on 27 June 1941 for two prototypes of an enlarged version powered by the same V-1710-47. The new design was given the designation XP-63 and serials were 41-19511 and 41-19512. A third prototype was also ordered, 42-78015, using the Packard V-1650, the US-built version of the Rolls-Royce Merlin engine.

The XP-63 was larger in all dimensions than the Airacobra. The wing was redesigned again, this time with new NACA laminar flow airfoils, 66(215)-116 a=0.6 at the root and a NACA 66(215)-216 a=0.6 at the tip. The wing taper ratio was approximately 2:1, span was 38 ft 4 in (11.68 m), and wing area was 248 ft^{2} (23.0 m^{2}). The engine was fitted with a second remotely mounted supercharger, supplementing the normal single-stage supercharger. At higher altitudes, when additional boost was required, a hydraulic clutch would engage the second supercharger, adding 10,000 ft (3,000 m) to the service ceiling. A larger four-bladed propeller was also standardized. A persistent complaint about the Airacobra was that its nose armament was not easily accessible for ground maintenance; to cure this problem the XP-63 airframe was fitted with larger cowling panels.

In September 1942, even before the prototype flew, the USAAF ordered it into production as the P-63A (Model 33). The P-63A's armament was to be the same as the current P-39Q, a single 37 mm (1.46 in) M4 cannon firing through the propeller hub, two synchronized .50 in (12.7 mm) machine guns in the cowl, and two .50 in (12.7 mm) machine guns in underwing gondolas.

The first prototype, 41-19511, flew for the first time on 7 December 1942. It was destroyed on 28 January 1943 when its landing gear failed to extend. The second prototype, 41-19512, followed on 5 February 1943. It, too, was destroyed, this time due to an engine failure. The Merlin-engined 42-78015 (as Merlins were primarily needed for the P-51 Mustang) was delivered with another Allison instead, a -93, which had a war emergency rating of 1,500 hp (1,100 kW) at sea level, making this prototype one of the fastest Kingcobras built, attaining 421 mph (678 km/h) at 24,100 ft (7,300 m).

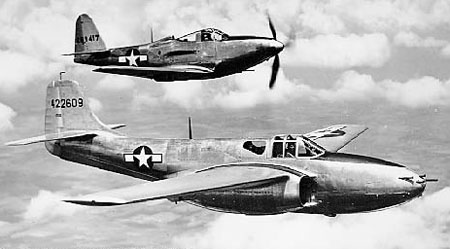
First production P-59A with a P-63 behind.

Deliveries of production P-63As began in October 1943. The USAAF concluded the Kingcobra was inferior to the Mustang, and declined to order larger quantities. American allies, particularly the Soviet Union, had a great need for fighter aircraft, however, and the Soviets were already the largest users of the Airacobra. Therefore, the Kingcobra was ordered into production to be delivered under Lend-Lease. In February 1944, the Soviet government sent a highly experienced test pilot, Andrey G. Kochetkov, and an aviation engineer, Fyodor P. Suprun, to the Bell factories to participate in the development of the first production variant, the P-63A. Initially ignored by Bell engineers, Kochetkov's expert testing of the machine's spin characteristics (which led to airframe buckling) eventually led to a significant Soviet role in the development. After flat spin recovery proved impossible, and upon Kochetkov's making a final recommendation that pilots should bail out upon entering such a spin, he received a commendation from the Irving Parachute Company. The Kingcobra's maximum aft CG was moved forward to facilitate recovery from spins.

P-63A-8, SN 269261, was extensively tested at TsAGI in what was then the world's largest wind tunnel. Soviet input was significant. With the Soviet Union being the largest buyer of the aircraft, Bell was quick to implement their suggestions. Most of the changes in the A sub-variants were a direct result of Soviet input, e.g. increased pilot armor and fuselage hardpoint on the A-5, underwing hardpoints and extra fuel tanks on the A-6, etc. The Soviet Union even experimented with ski landing gear for the P-63A-6, but this never reached production. Most significantly, Soviet input resulted in moving the main cannon forward, favorably changing the center of gravity, and increasing its ammunition load from 30 to 58 rounds for the A-9 variant. The P-63 had an impressive roll rate, besting the US P-47, P-40, and P-51—and the Japanese Navy's Kawanishi N1K2 Shiden-Kai fighter—with a rate of 110° per second at 275 mph (443 km/h).

=== Swept-wing L-39 ===
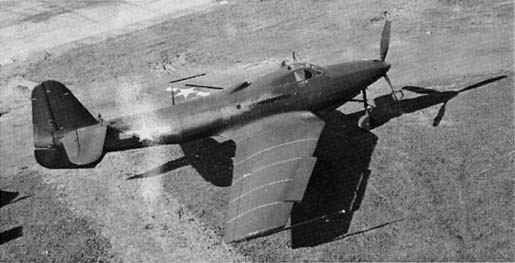
L-39 with swept wings, extended rear fuselage, ventral tail fin and P-39 prop

After the war, two war surplus P-63Cs were modified by Bell under Navy contract for flight testing of low-speed and stall characteristics of high-speed wing designs. The aircraft received new wings with adjustable leading edge slats, trailing edge flaps and a pronounced sweep of 35 degrees. The wings had no wheel wells; only the nose gear was retractable. L-39-1 first flew 23 April 1946, demonstrating a need for extra tail surface and rear fuselage length to balance the aircraft in flight—the wing repositioning reduced empennage effectiveness and moved the center of lift aft. A lighter three-bladed propeler from a P-39Q-10 was mounted and the necessary changes to the empennage were made. L-39-2 incorporated these adjustments from the start. L-39-1 later went to NACA at Langley for wind tunnel testing, where much valuable data was gathered. L-39-2 also served as a testbed for the Bell X-2 40-degree wing design.

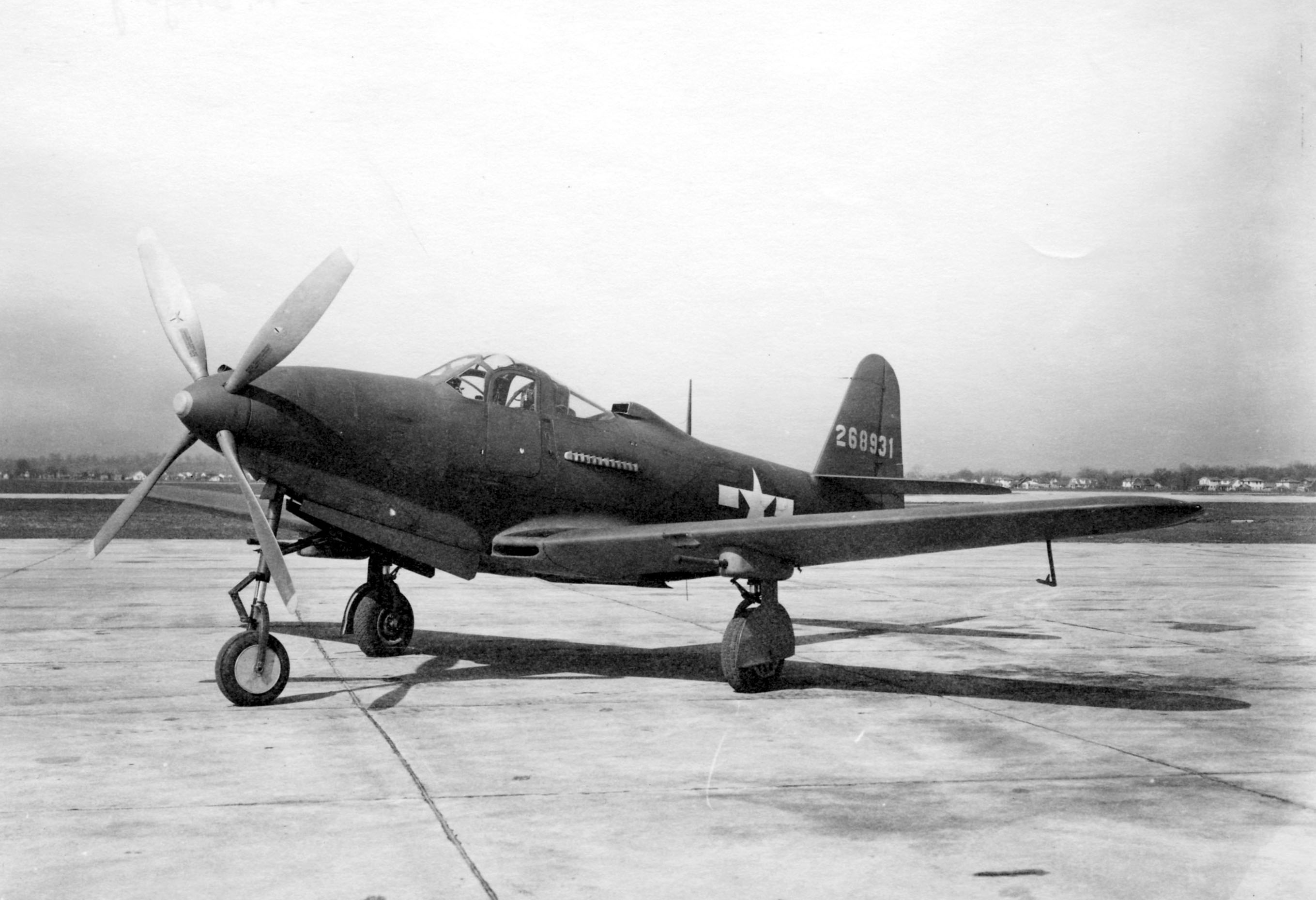
A P-63A in USAAF service. (Image: USAF).

== Operational service ==
=== Soviet Union ===
One of the enduring myths regarding the P-39/P-63 in Soviet use is that because of its armament, in particular the 37mm nose cannon, it excelled as a ground-attack aircraft, even a "tank buster". In translating and preparing this manuscript ... I have had the opportunity to peruse several Russian-language sources. Mentions of ... this aircraft in the ground-attack role are so rare ... as to be exceptional... The "tank buster" myth has its roots in the misunderstanding of the general wartime role of the Red Air Force and in the imprecise translation of specific Russian-Language terms... The specific ... term most often used to describe the ... role of the Airacobra-equipped Red Air Force fighter units ... is prikrytiye sukhoputnykh voysk [coverage of ground forces]... Frequent misunderstanding ... as to the combat role of the P-39 in Soviet use is based in part on imprecise translation of the term prikrytiye sukhoputnykh voysk to "ground support". The latter term ... suggests the attacking of ground targets in support of ground troops, also called "close air support". Did a Soviet Airacobra pilot ever strafe a German tank? Undoubtedly. But this was never a primary mission or strong suit for this aircraft.

— James Gebhardt, in: Dmitry Loza & James F. Gebhardt, 2002, Commanding the Red Army's Sherman Tanks: The World War II Memoirs of Hero of the Soviet Union, Dmitriy Loza, 2002, pp. 15–16.

In general, official Soviet histories played down the role of Lend-Lease supplied aircraft in favor of local designs, but it is known that the P-63 was a successful fighter aircraft in Soviet service. There has been a common misconception that both the P-39 and P-63 were used mainly as ground attack aircraft. As historian James F. Gebhardt pointed out in a translation of one Soviet memoir (see quote box, right), this was likely a result of mistranslations of Soviet military terminology. The role known as prikrytiye sukhoputnykh voysk literally "coverage of ground forces" was not the same as close air support in other air forces.

The first version to be supplied in quantity to the Soviet Union was the P-63A-7 with a higher vertical tail, and reinforced wings and fuselage. The fuselage proved to need strengthening; consequently, in October 1944 a reinforcement kit for operational P-63s was developed.

Air Transport Command ferry pilots, including pilots of the WASP program, picked up the planes at the Bell factory at Niagara Falls, New York, and flew them to Great Falls, Montana and then onward via the Northwest Staging Route through Canada to Alaska, where Soviet ferry pilots, many of them also women, would take delivery of the aircraft at Nome and fly them to the Soviet Union over the Bering Strait via the Alaska-Siberia route (ALSIB). A total of 2,397 (2,672, according to other sources) aircraft were delivered to the USSR, 72.6% of the overall 3,303 production aircraft.

P-63s were allegedly supplied to the Soviet Union only on the condition that they be reserved for future operations against Japanese forces, under a 1943 agreement with the US. As such, all P-63 units were supposedly based in the Soviet Far East. However, according to anecdotal accounts, from both Soviet and German sources, some P-63s saw service against the Luftwaffe. A Soviet pilot who served under A. I. Pokryshkin, reported that the entire 4th Guards Fighter Aviation Regiment (4 GvIAP) secretly converted to P-63s in 1944. Stuka pilot Hans Rudel stated in his memoirs that, over the Courland pocket, in early 1945, he and other German pilots had often encountered "American types of aircraft, especially Airacobras, Kingcobras and Bostons". One account states they were in action at Königsberg, in Poland and in the final assault on Berlin. There are German reports of P-63s shot down by both fighters and flak. Nevertheless, official Soviet records do not record P-63s being used in Europe.

The Soviets developed successful group aerial fighting tactics for the Bell fighters and scored a surprising number of aerial victories over a variety of German aircraft. Low ceilings, short missions, good radios, a sealed and warm cockpit and ruggedness contributed to their effectiveness. To pilots who had once flown the tricky Polikarpov I-16, the aerodynamic quirks of the mid-engined aircraft were unimportant. In the Far East, P-63 and P-39 aircraft were used in the Soviet invasion of Manchukuo and northern Korea. In the Pacific theater, the Kingcobras flew escort, close air support and ground attack missions. The Soviet P-63s achieved their first official air victory on 15 August 1945, when Lejtenant I. F. Miroshnichenko from 17th IAP/190 IAD, shot down a Nakajima Ki-43 Hayabusa IJAAS fighter off the coast of northern Korea.

Sufficient aircraft continued in use after World War II for them to be given the western reporting name of "Fred". By 9 May 1945, operational units still had 1,148 Kingcobras on strength. On 8 October 1950, two USAF F-80Cs from the 49th Fighter Group breached the USSR's border and attacked Sukhaya Rechka airfield 19 mi (31 km) south-west of Vladivostok and 62 mi (100 km) from the Soviet-Korean border, making two strafing runs before returning to their home base. Soviet sources say the attack was intentional, but the pilots claimed it was a result of a navigational error. The airfield belonged to the Air Forces of the Pacific Fleet (VVS TOF), but it was occupied by the 821st Fighter Aviation Regiment (821 IAP) of the 190th Fighter Aviation Division (190 IAD). Mostly aircraft of the 1st Squadron of 821 IAP were hit with 12 P-63s damaged, one P-63 burned to the ground while the other damaged aircraft were able to be repaired. There were no human losses.

=== France ===
In 1945, 114 later models were delivered to the French Air Force (Armée de l'Air), but they arrived too late to see service in World War II. They did see service during the First Indochina War before being replaced in 1951.

Initially, the French Kingcobras were deployed to Algeria. Fighter squadron (Groupe de Chasse) 2/6 "Normandie-Niemen", previously equipped with P-39 Airacobras, received their Kingcobras on 18 July at Casablanca; the pilots were surprised by the higher landing speed of their new aircraft. The Kingcobra were scrambled to Indochina when the insurgency broke. Only 60 Kingcobras were operational in Indochina in January 1950, mainly because the Americans refused to supply spare parts. Starting in February 1951, the squadrons equipped with Kingcobra started to receive Grumman F8F Bearcats as replacements. Most Kingcobras were mothballed by July. The last flight of a Kingcobra in Indochina took place on 6 September 1951.

=== "Pinball" operations ===
Its main use in American service was the unusual one of a manned flying target for gunnery practice. The aircraft was generally painted bright orange to increase its visibility. All armament and the regular armor was removed from these RP-63 aircraft, and over a ton of armored sheet metal was applied to the aircraft. This was fitted with sensors that would detect hits, and these hits were signaled by illuminating a light in the propeller hub where the cannon would have been. This earned the aircraft the unofficial nickname of Pinball. Special frangible rounds made of a lead/Bakelite combination were developed that would disintegrate upon impact. These were known as the "Cartridge, Caliber .30, Frangible, Ball, M22". In 1990, veteran Pinball pilot, Ivan L. Hickman, wrote Operation Pinball about the training flights.

=== RAE Testing ===
British engineers, like the Americans, had a growing interest during World War II in laminar flow airfoils. To learn more about the use of laminar flow airfoils, in 1945 the Royal Aircraft Establishment (RAE) undertook a flight test program with one of the two P-63As that the United Kingdom had received. The aircraft was equipped with a wake rake array mounted outboard, behind the wing, to allow the momentum deficit, and thus section drag, to be measured.

The RAE first tested it in an "as delivered" configuration. The wing airfoil was designed to support laminar flow to 60 percent of chord. In the "as delivered" configuration, a profile drag was measured which was representative of the wing section with boundary layer transition at the leading edge percent laminar flow). Reducing the surface roughness reduced the drag at low lift coefficients to a level representative of laminar flow to 35 percent of chord. Measurements were made of the surface waviness. This showed peak wave amplitudes, above the mean, of approximately 0.011 inches (0.28 mm) over a two-inch (5.1 cm) span. The standard waviness criteria shows the critical wave height to be 0.0053 inches (0.13 mm) for this use. To reduce the waviness, RAE personnel stripped the wing to bare metal. The wing was then sprayed with two coats of primer paint and a coat of paint type filler. After the paint was dry, it was sanded in a chordwise direction, using sanding blocks whose curvature matched the local surface curvature. This was repeated several times. Surface waviness was then measured and found to be no more than 0.005 inches (0.13 mm). In flight, this configuration was found to have a profile drag representative of boundary layer transition at 60 percent of chord. This gave researchers an idea of what level of wing surface quality was required to get the benefits of laminar flow airfoils.

=== Postwar air racers ===
Numerous surplus P-63s ended up on the air racing circuit in the immediate postwar era. Charles Tucker purchased two P-63s from the disposal facility at Kingman, Arizona just after the war. He entered one of them, the Tucker Special as Race 28 with the name Flying Red Horse emblazoned on the nose (civilian register N62995) in the 1946 Thompson Trophy race. He had clipped the wings by 12 ft 9 in (3.89 m) in an attempt to improve its speed, reducing the span to 25 ft 9 in (7.85 m). The second one (44-4126 (XN63231 Race 30)) was intended for the 1946 Bendix cross country race. It was initially fitted with two wingtip drop tanks. In 1947, the drop tanks were removed and the wings were clipped to 28 ft 6 in (8.69 m).

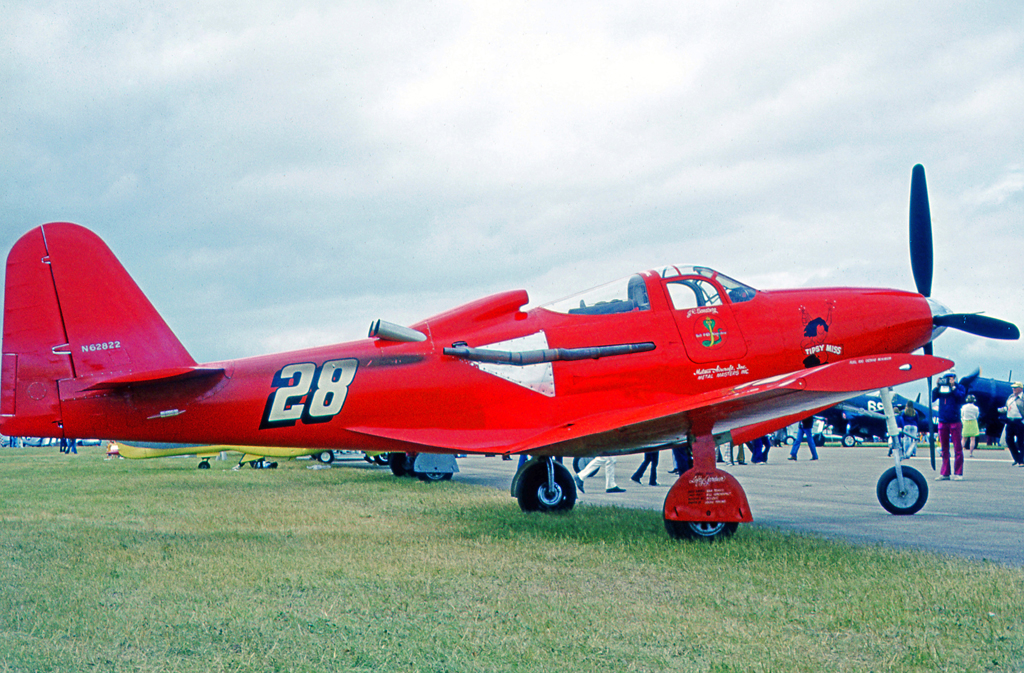
Bell RP-63C racer Tipsy Miss wearing No. 28 at Oshkosh Wisconsin in 1974.

Two other significant racers were flown later. Tipsy Miss, John Sandberg's clipped-wingtip P-63 unlimited racer, was identified as "Race 28," and painted in bright orange, white and black race numbers with a chrome spinner. Later sold to a European pilot, this P-63 was destroyed in a fatal accident in 1990 Crazy Horse Campgrounds was the most radically modified P-63 Kingcobra ever. Larry Haven's "Race 90" clipped-wing unlimited racer had a tiny bubble canopy installed; it appeared in all silver (unpolished aluminum) finish with a white rudder and black trim. The aircraft later crashed into the ocean on a test flight in 1972.

== Variants ==
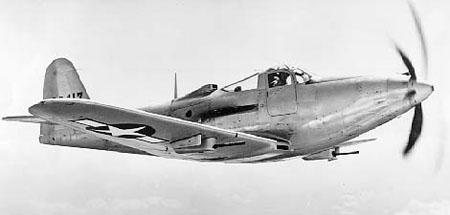
P-63 with underwing gun pods

- XP-63 Prototypes (two) (company designation was Model 24); USAAF serials (41-19511 and 41-19512).
- XP-63A Following the loss of the first two prototypes, an additional test aircraft was procured, USAAF serial 42-78015, originally ordered as a testbed for the proposed Rolls-Royce Merlin-powered P-63B.
- P-63A The production model Bell Model 33; 1725 P-63As produced in various sub-marks.
- P-63B Proposed Rolls-Royce Merlin-powered P-63B series was canceled due to lack of availability of Merlin engines.
- P-63C Second production series differed from the P-63A by being powered by the uprated Allison V-1710-117 engine with a war emergency rating of 1,500 hp (1,120 kW) at sea level and 1,800 hp (1,340 kW) with water injection. The wingspan was reduced by 10 inches (250 mm). A total production run of 1,227 was completed.
- P-63D One aircraft (43-11718) powered by an Allison V-1710-109 (E22) 1,425 hp (1,063 kW) featured a 10 in (25 cm) wingspan increase (to 39 ft 2 in (11.94 m), gross area being increased to 255 sq ft (23.7 m^{2}) and, most noticeably, a rearward-sliding bubble canopy. The series was canceled in 1945.
- P-63E Essentially similar to the P-63D with the exception of a ventral fin extension and the use of a standard "cab"-style cockpit; only 13 built.
- P-63F Bell Model 43 variant featured an enlarged vertical tail and Allison V-1710-135; only two (43-11719 and 43-11722) built. 43-11719 was destroyed in a midair collision in 2022.
- P-63U Converted lend-lease P-63s by the Soviet Union into trainer aircraft, also referred to as the UP-63 and UTI P-63. Modification included a stretched forward canopy going up to the nose of the aircraft. Several hundred were converted starting in 1948, and remained in service until the late 1950s. Varitants converted in Tbilisi were referred to as P-63V.
- RP-63A/C "Pinball" Target aircraft with five modified from P-63As and 95 modified on production lines; in 1948, surviving RP-63A aircraft were redesignated QF-63A. A further 200 production RP-63C aircraft were modified on the production line. Similarly, the surviving RP-63Cs were redesignated QF-63Cs. Many of the "target" aircraft were actually used as target tugs.

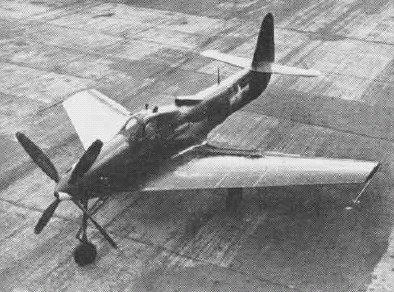
L-39-2 with swept wings and four-bladed prop.

- RP-63G "Pinball" "Dedicated" flying targets which included two prototypes (43-11723 and 11724) and 30 production aircraft that incorporated a flush dorsal inlet but, more significantly, lights that would come on when the target was struck with frangible munitions. In 1948, the remaining RP-63Gs were redesignated QF-63Gs.
- L-39 Two war surplus P-63Cs modified by Bell under Navy contract for flight testing of low-speed and stall characteristics of high-speed wing designs.

== Operators ==
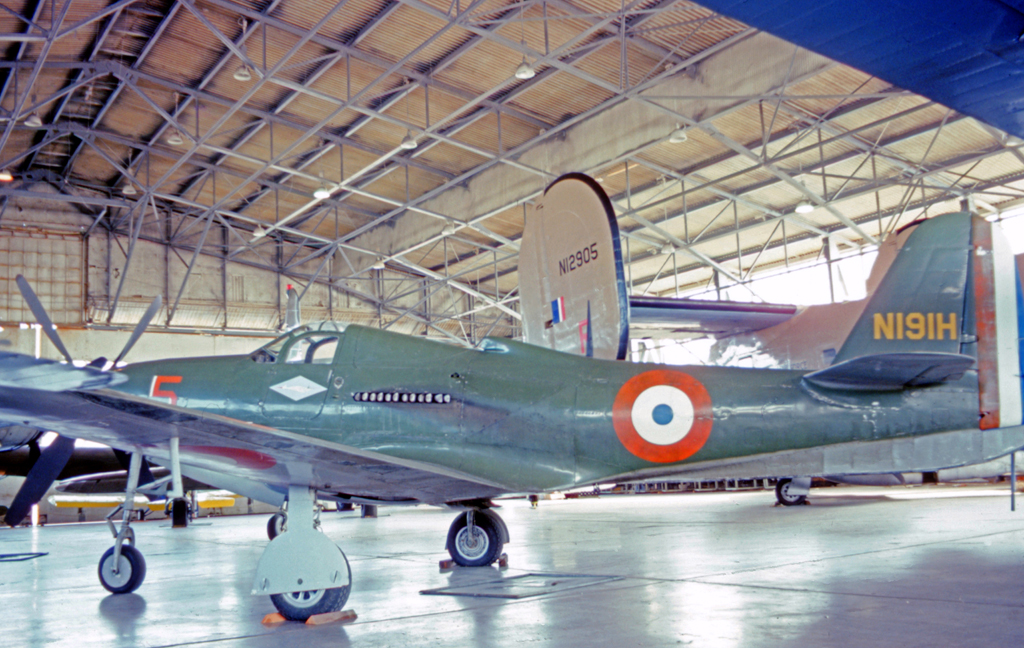
RP-63C (ex-"Pinball") Kingcobra in French Air Force markings at the Commemorative Air Force museum at Harlingen Texas in 1975

France

- French Air Force

Honduras

- Honduran Air Force (post-war)

Soviet Union

- Soviet Air Force

United Kingdom

- Royal Aircraft Establishment (two P-63As for evaluation)

United States

- United States Army Air Forces

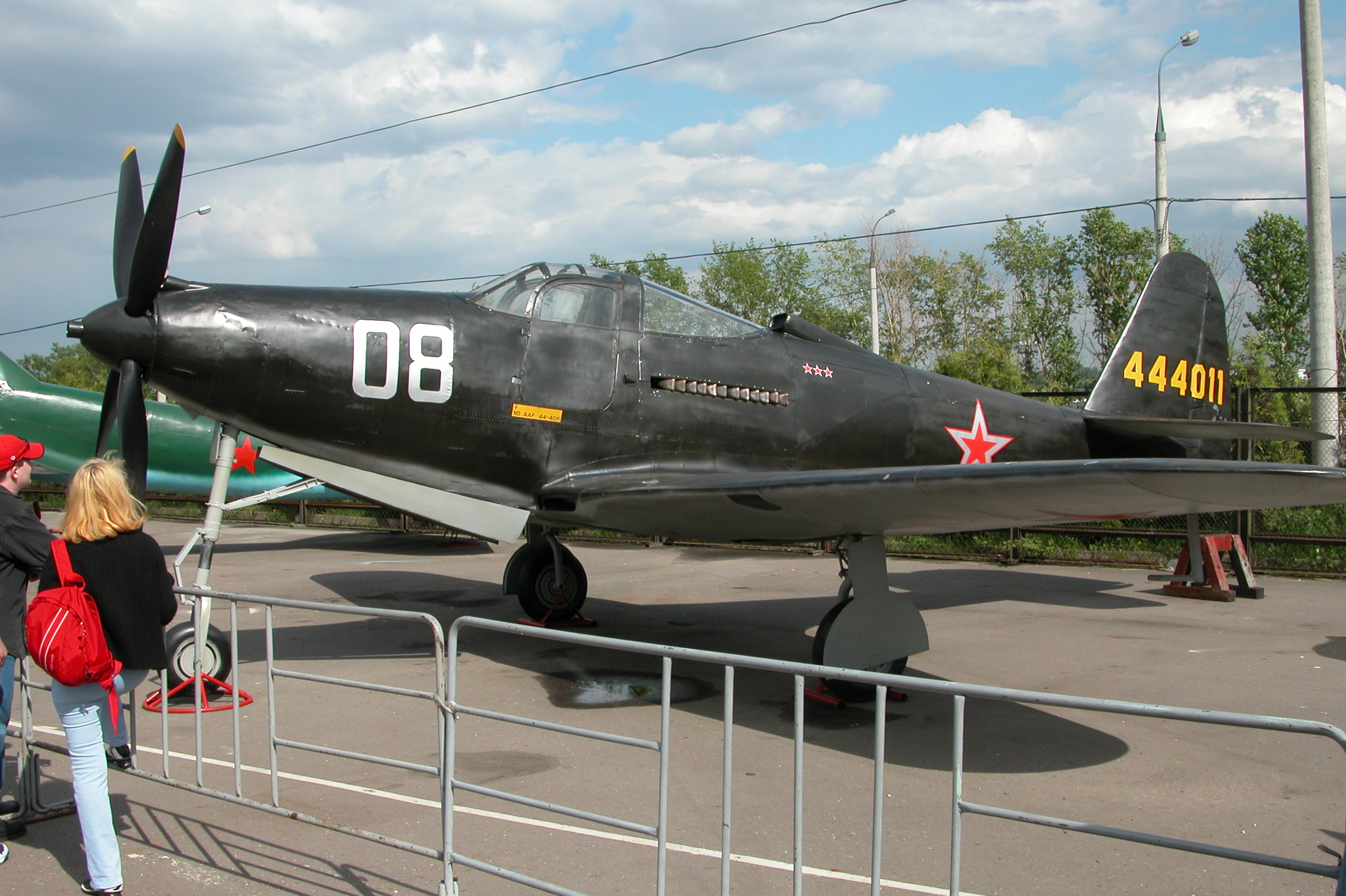
Bell P-63 King Cobra (identifiable as such by its vertical tail and four-bladed propeller) on display in Victory Park, Moscow, June 2004.

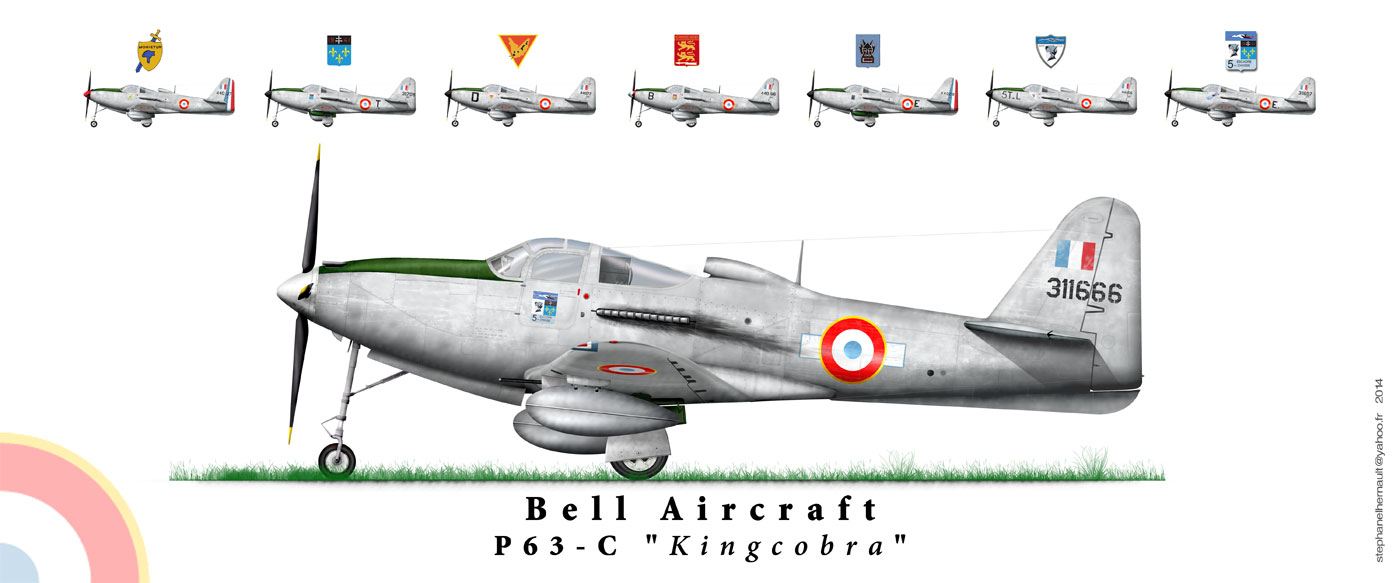
P-63C of the Armée de l'Air

== Surviving aircraft ==
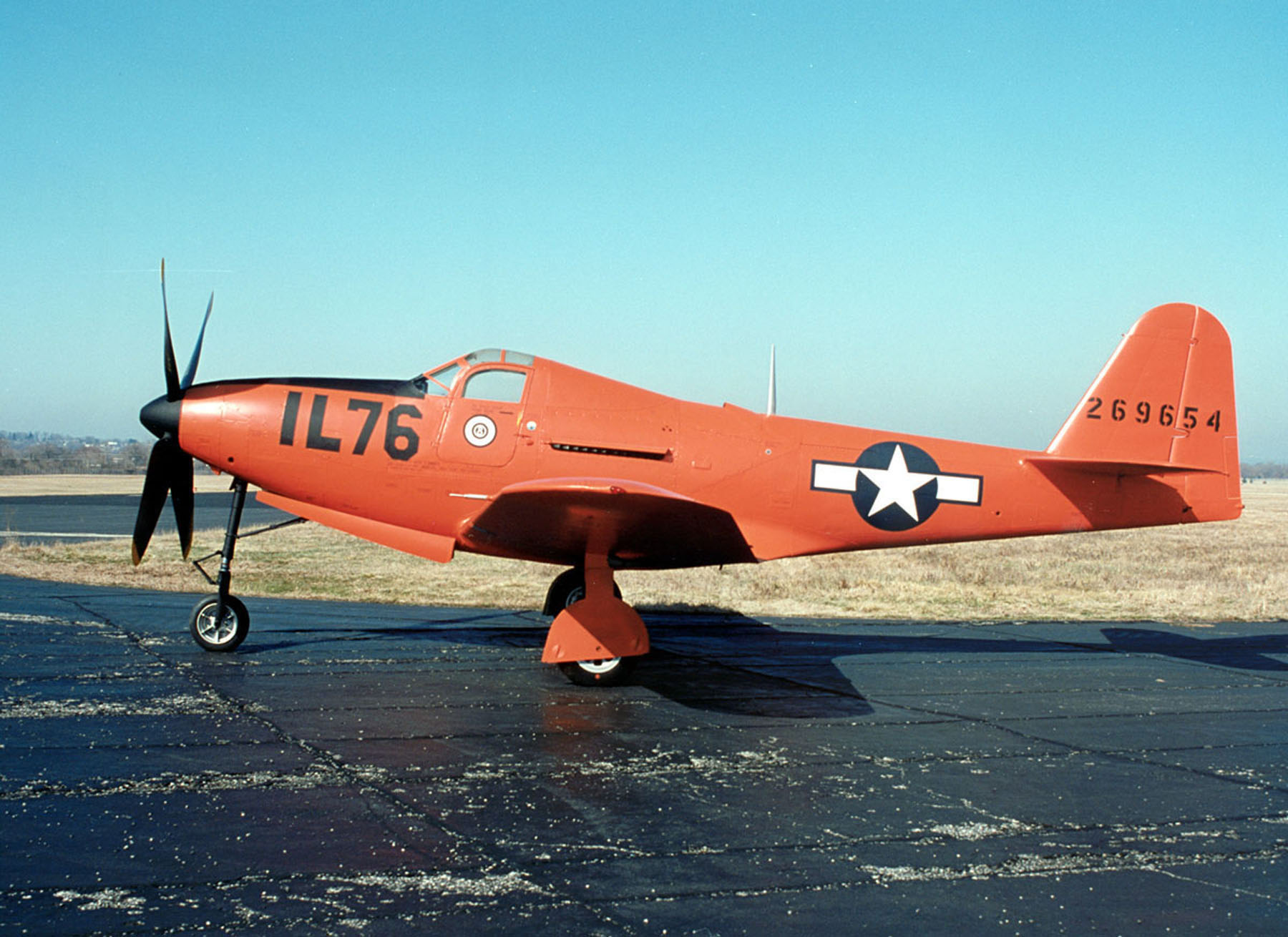
P-63E-1BE 43-11728 "Pinball" of the Air Force Museum

=== Honduras ===
On display

P-63E

- 43-11730: Honduran Aviation Museum, Toncontin International Airport, Tegucigalpa.

=== Russia ===
On display

P-63A

- 42-68875: Russian Air Force Museum, Moscow.

P-63C

- 44-4011: Museum of the Great Patriotic War, Moscow.

=== United Kingdom ===
Under restoration

P-63C

- 43-11137: under restoration at the Wings Museum, Balcombe, West Sussex. The museum also has 5 other P-63 airframes.

=== United States ===
Airworthy

P-63A

- 42-68864 Pretty Polly: Palm Springs Air Museum in Palm Springs, California.
- 42-68941 TEST/Miss Betty: Commemorative Air Force (previously Dixie Wing; after 2020, Airbase Georgia) in Peachtree City, Georgia.
- 42-69080 Fatal Fang: Yanks Air Museum in Chino, California.

P-63C

- 43-11223: Legacy Flight Museum in Rexburg, Idaho. (Painted as P-63A-6/42-69021).

On display

P-63A

- 42-70609: Military Aviation Museum in Virginia Beach, Virginia.

P-63E

- 43-11727: Pima Air & Space Museum in Tucson, Arizona. It is on loan from the National Museum of the United States Air Force at Wright-Patterson AFB in Dayton, Ohio.
- 43-11728: Museum of Aviation (Warner Robins), Warner Robins, Georgia, on loan from the National Museum of the United States Air Force at Wright-Patterson AFB in Dayton, Ohio, where it was previously displayed.

RP-63G

- 45-57295: Lackland AFB, Texas.

Under restoration or in storage

P-63A

- 42-70255 Edyth Louise: in storage at the Paul Garber Facility of the National Air and Space Museum in Silver Hill, Maryland.

RP-63C

- 43-11117: in storage at Fantasy of Flight in Polk City, Florida.

== Accidents and incidents ==
On 3 June 2001, a Bell P-63A crashed during the Biggin Hill International Air Fair in London, England, killing the pilot. The pilot was at the top of a vertical maneuver when he appeared to have lost control of the plane. This was the second plane accident in 24 hours at Biggin Hill following the crash of a de Havilland Vampire that killed both pilots.

On 12 November 2022, P-63F 43-11719, owned by the Commemorative Air Force and piloted by Craig Hutain, collided with Boeing B-17G Flying Fortress Texas Raiders at an airshow in Dallas, Texas. 43-11719 was one of only five remaining airworthy P-63s and was the only surviving P-63F of the two that were built. Six people were killed, one in the P-63 and five in the B-17.

== Specifications (P-63A) ==
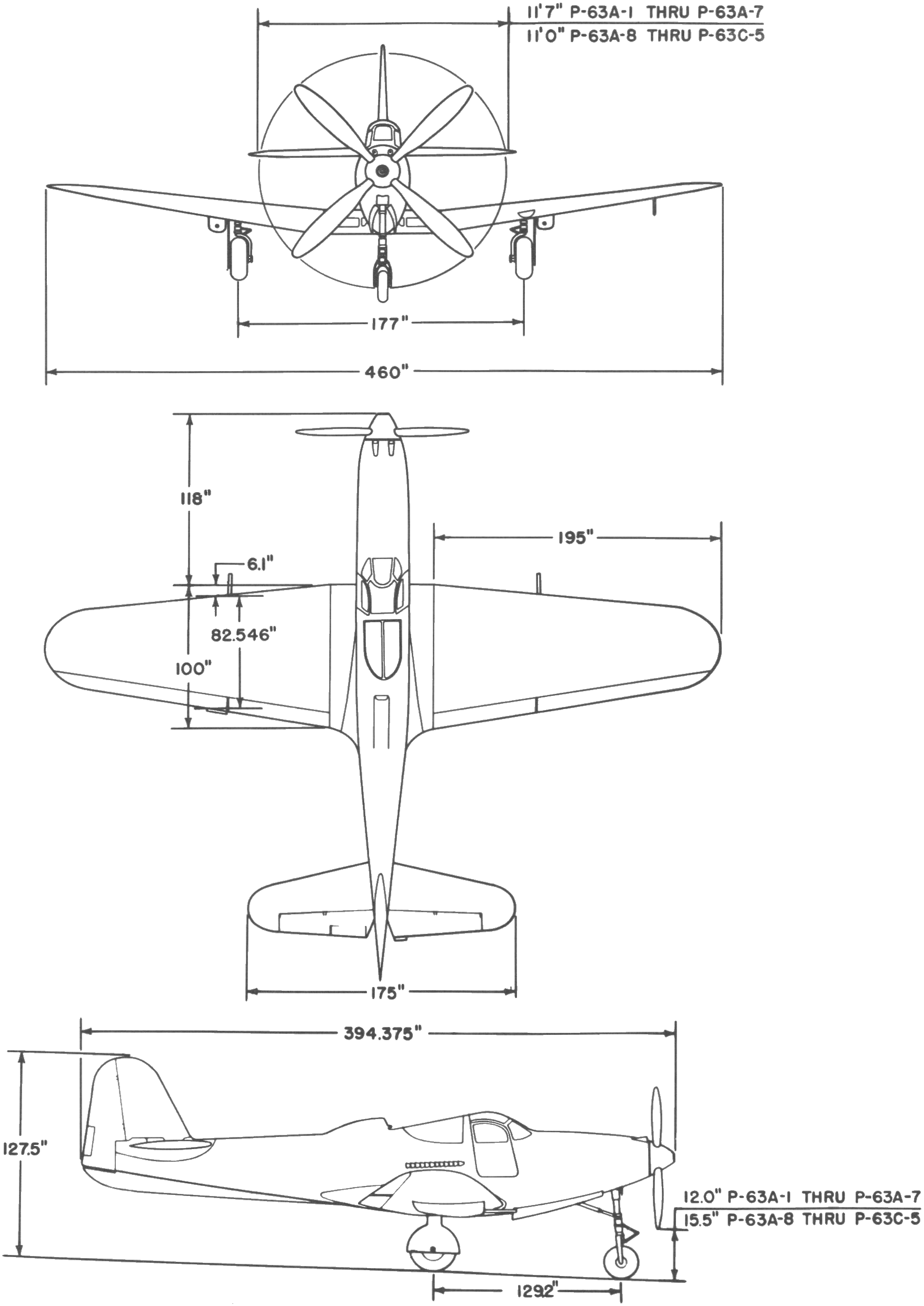
3-view line drawing of the Bell P-63A Kingcobra

Data from Jane's Fighting Aircraft of World War II.

General characteristics

- Crew: One
- Length: 32 ft 8 in (9.96 m)
- Wingspan: 38 ft 4 in (11.68 m)
- Height: 12 ft 7 in (3.84 m)
- Wing area: 248 sq ft (23.0 m^{2})
- Airfoil: root: NACA 66-116; tip: NACA 66-216
- Empty weight: 6,800 lb (3,084 kg)
- Gross weight: 8,800 lb (3,992 kg)
- Max takeoff weight: 10,700 lb (4,853 kg)
- Powerplant: 1 × Allison V-1710-117 V-12 liquid-cooled piston engine, 1,800 hp (1,300 kW)
- Propellers: 4-bladed constant-speed propeler

Performance

- Maximum speed: 410 mph (660 km/h, 360 kn) at 25,000 ft (7,600 m)
- Range: 450 mi (720 km, 390 nmi)
- Ferry range: 2,200 mi (3,500 km, 1,900 nmi)
- Service ceiling: 43,000 ft (13,000 m)
- Rate of climb: 2,500 ft/min (13 m/s)
- Wing loading: 35.48 lb/sq ft (173.2 kg/m^{2})
- Power/mass: 0.20 hp/lb (0.33 kW/kg)

Armament

- Guns: ** 1 × 37 mm (1.5 in) M4 cannon firing through the propeler hub. From the A-9 version of the aircraft onward, the M4 gun was replaced with the slightly improved M10 37 mm cannon, which used a disintegrating link ammunition belt, increasing the ammo capacity to 58 rounds; the M10 also had a slightly higher rate of fire.
  - 4 × 0.50 in (12.7 mm) M2 Browning machine guns (two synchronized in the nose, two in the wings)
- Bombs: 1,500 lb (680 kg) bomb load on wing and fuselage

== See also ==
- Hazel Ying Lee

Related development

- Bell P-39 Airacobra
- Bell L-39
- Blue Yonder EZ King Cobra: P-63 replica

Aircraft of comparable role, configuration, and era

- Focke-Wulf Fw 190
- Kawanishi N1K
- Messerschmitt Me 309
- North American P-51 Mustang
- Republic P-47 Thunderbolt
- Yakovlev Yak-9

Related lists

- List of military aircraft of the United States
- List of fighter aircraft
- List of aircraft of World War II
