= Belinda Nash =

American author and historian (1946–2016)

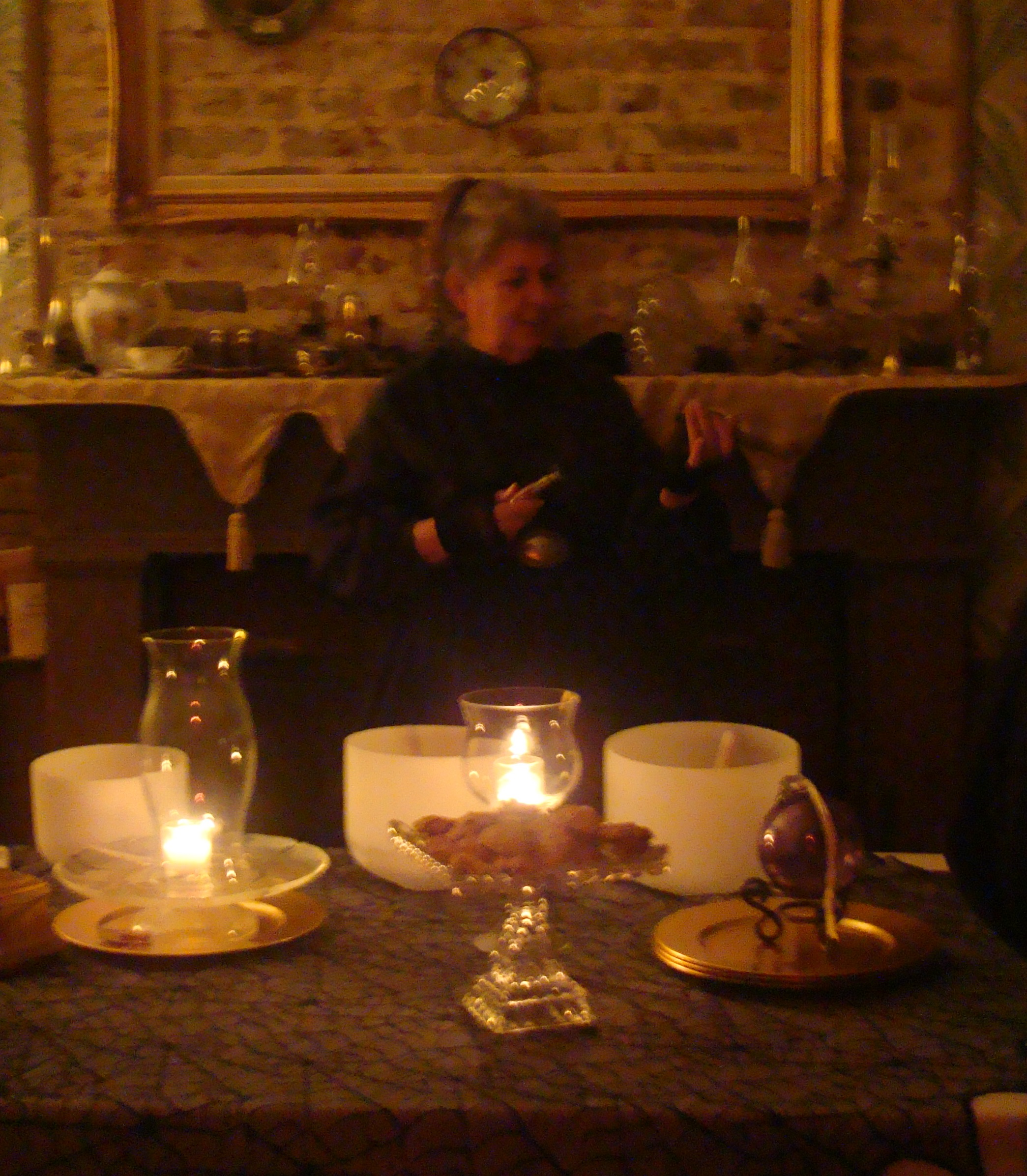
- Nash at the Ferry Plantation House, Halloween 2010
- Born: October 27, 1946; Canada
- Died: February 16, 2016 (aged 69); Virginia Beach, Virginia, U.S.
- Occupations: Author; Historian; Activist
- Organization: Ferry Plantation House

Belinda Jacqueline Nash (October 27, 1946 – February 16, 2016) was a Canadian-American historian, author and activist. She wrote a biography of Grace Sherwood, the last person "convicted" by ducking of being a witch in Virginia. As a result of Nash's work, Sherwood was given a pardon, 300 years after her trial by ordeal.

== History ==
In the 1980s, Nash moved from Stratford, Ontario, Canada to Virginia Beach. She became interested in the etymology of the name Witchduck Road which was close to her home. As a result, she researched Grace Sherwood for around 20 years and with her daughter, Danielle Sheets, co-wrote a biography of her, A Place in Time: The Age of the Witch of Pungo. Sherwood's life had been described before by Louisa Venable Kyle in The Witch of Pungo and Other Historical Stories of the Early Colonies, a fiction book written for children including biographical data, published in 1973.

Nash has been on the board of Directors of the Ferry Plantation House in Virginia Beach from 1996 and its director from 1999. She has provided information on Sherwood to visitors, dressed in a period costume. The ducking has been re-enacted annually. Sherwood was an unusual character who survived the ordeal and lived into her eighties.

In response to Nash's activity, the Governor of Virginia, Tim Kaine, pardoned Sherwood on July 10, 2006, 300 years after her trial by ordeal. He wrote: "We also can celebrate the fact that a woman's equality is constitutionally protected today, and women have the freedom to pursue their hopes and dreams." During the ceremony at the Ferry Plantation House, where Sherwood's trial was partly held, the annual re-enactment was performed.

Also in 2006, Nash successfully raised funds for a bronze statue of Sherwood, despite finding that "No one wanted a statue of a witch". The statue was finally erected in 2007 at the Sentara Independence outpatient care center in Witchduck Rd.

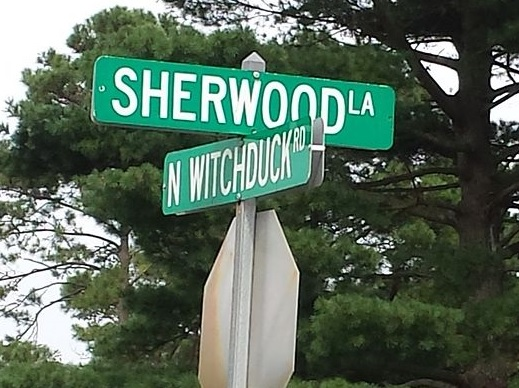
Street sign in the Witch Duck Point housing area of Virginia Beach.

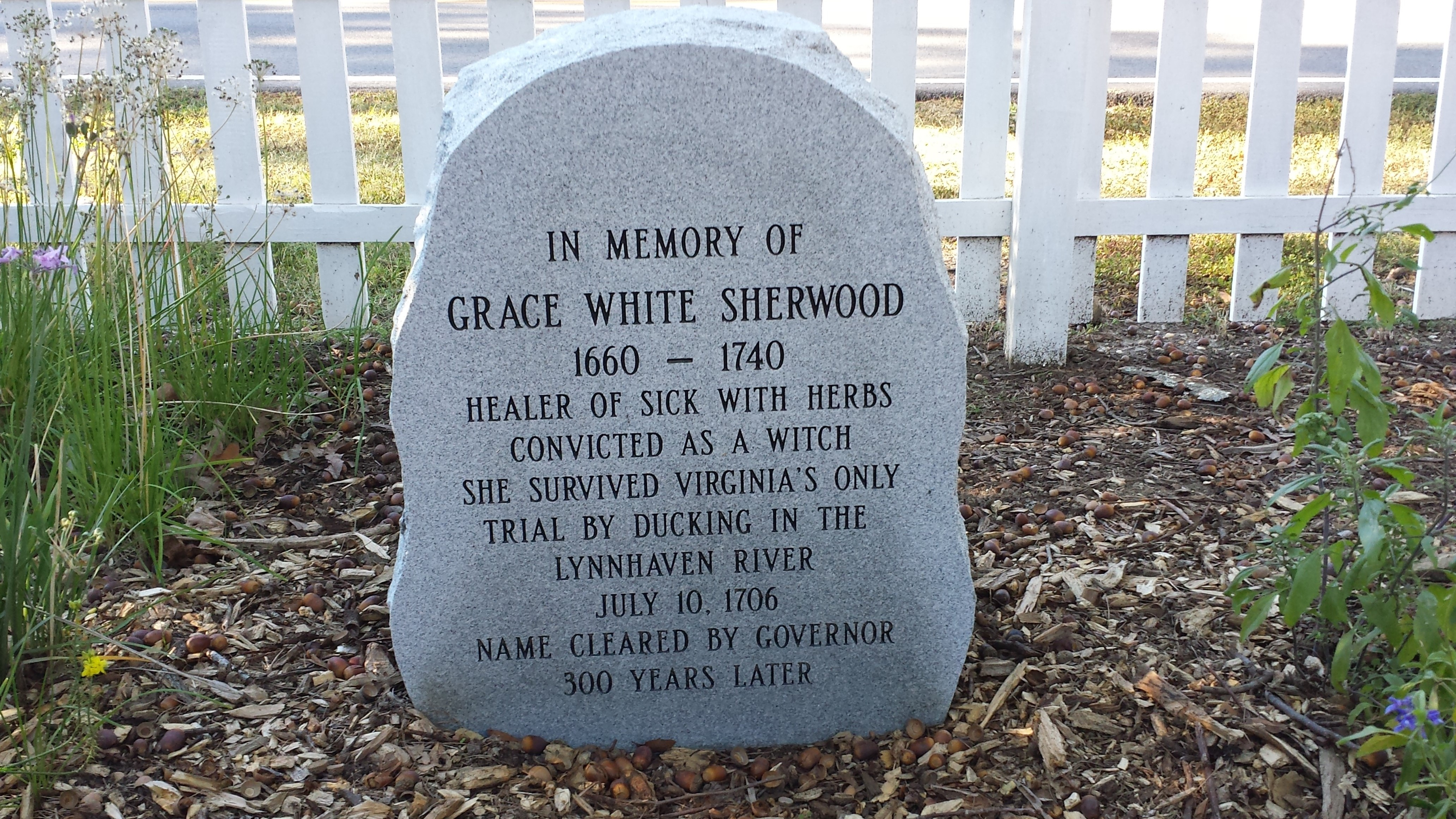
Memorial marker for Grace Sherwood

In 2014, a memorial marker was placed at a herb garden of the Old Donation Episcopal Church, Sherwood's former parish church. Nash commented: "I was so happy when I heard this stone was going to be placed. My heart was relieved to hear the church was welcoming it."

Nash died on February 16, 2016, aged 69, after a long battle with cancer.
