= Legacy Flight Museum =

- Location within Idaho
- Established: 3 February 2006
- Location: Rexburg, Idaho
- Coordinates: 43.8346°N 111.8067°W
- Type: Aviation museum
- Website: www.rexburg.org/o/legacyflight/

The Legacy Flight Museum is an aviation museum located at the Rexburg–Madison County Airport in Rexburg, Idaho.

== History ==
The museum was founded by John and Terry Bagley and opened on 3 February 2006 in an 18,000 sq ft (1,700 m^{2}) hangar. Before the year was out, one of the museum's P-51s was substantially damaged in an emergency landing on the highway adjacent to the airport. An AD-4N that was on display at the museum was destroyed in a fatal accident on 8 March 2011. The museum received an A-4 in 2013.

The museum acquired a Beech 18 in 2016. An O-1E owned by the museum was substantially damaged during a crosswind landing on 12 June 2017. After the museum received 40 mm gun on loan from the city of Lewisville, Idaho in 2023, residents of the town disputed the move and requested that it be returned to its original display location as soon as possible.

== Exhibits ==
Exhibits at the museum include R-3350 and Centaurus engines and a Bofors 40 mm anti-aircraft gun.

== Collection ==
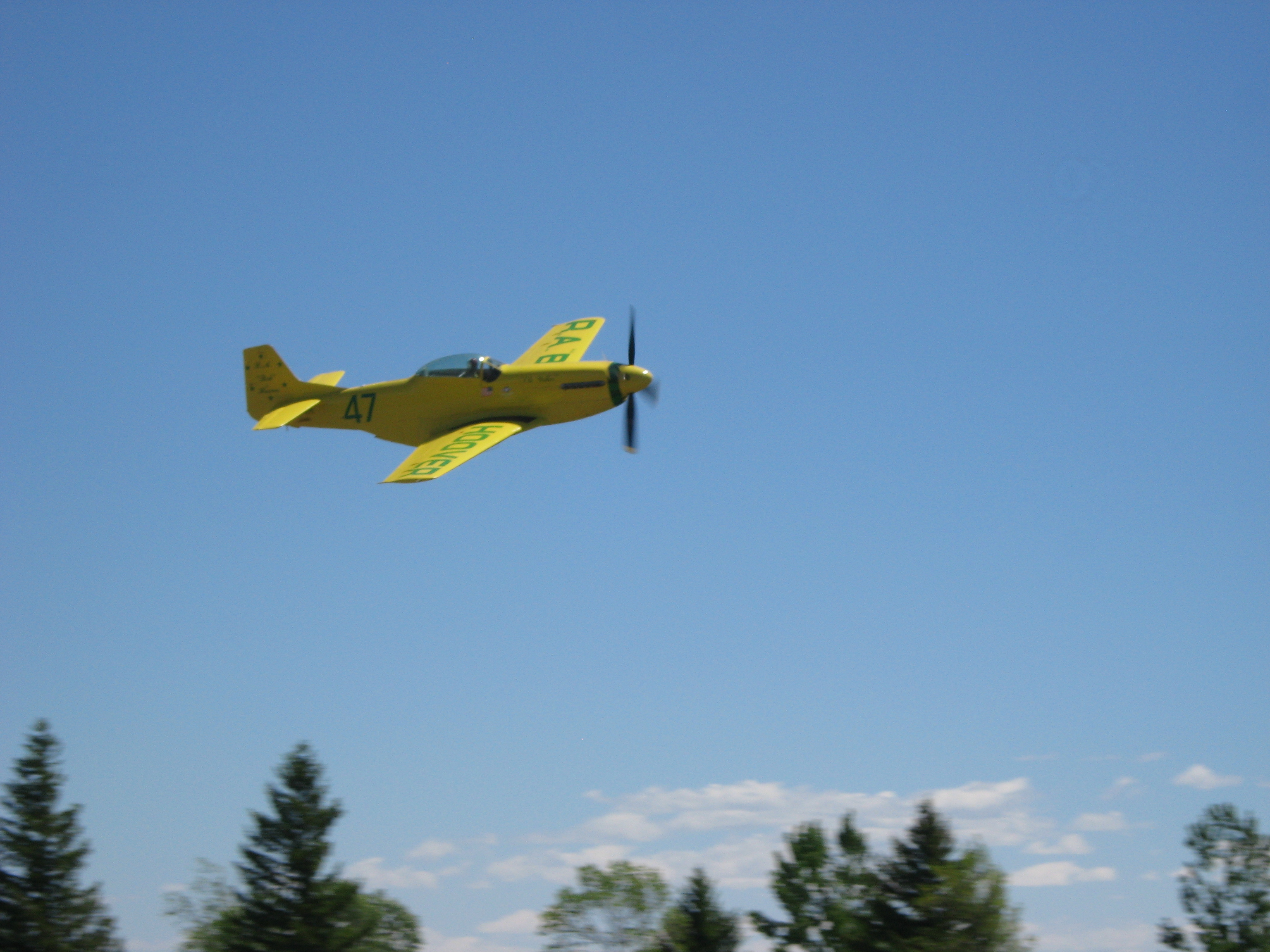
Ole Yeller during an airshow at the museum

- Beechcraft TC-45J
- Bell P-63C Kingcobra
- Boeing PT-17 Kaydet
- Cessna O-1E Bird Dog
- de Havilland Canada DHC-4 Caribou
- Douglas A-4 Skyhawk
- Globe GC-1B Swift
- Grumman S2F-1 Tracker
- Howard DGA-15P
- North American SNJ-3
- North American P-51D Mustang Mormon Mustang
- North American P-51D Mustang Ole Yeller
- Vultee V-77

== Events ==
The museum holds a biennial airshow.

== See also ==
- List of aviation museums
