= Witchduck Point =

Coordinates: 36°52′50.39″N 76°06′42.29″W

Ducking of Grace Sherwood
- Date: 10 July 1706
- Location: Witchduck, Virginia Beach, Virginia, USA
- Participants: Grace Sherwood, Virginia State Authorities

Witchduck Point is the name of the location where suspected witch Grace Sherwood was subjected to trial by water July 10, 1706. It is located within the neighborhood of Witchduck in Virginia Beach, Virginia.
