= Louisa Venable Kyle =

American journalist (1903–1999)

- Born: August 11, 1903; Norfolk, Virginia, U.S.
- Died: October 24, 1999 (aged 96); Virginia Beach, Virginia, U.S.
- Education: Mary Baldwin Seminary; Lasell Seminary
- Occupations: Author; Journalist
- Notable work: The Witch of Pungo (1973)

Louisa Venable Kyle (August 11, 1903 – October 24, 1999) was an American historian, author and journalist. She wrote works of fiction based on the history of her home state of Virginia.

== Biography ==
Born in Norfolk, she studied at Mary Baldwin Seminary and graduated from Lasell Seminary. In the 1950s she wrote for The Virginian-Pilot and The Portsmouth Star. She wrote about the first minister to Knotts Island on Currituck Sound to have lived there:

Knotts Island has never before had its minister live on the island, with the people. From the beginning, the people who live here on Currituck Sound have had to depend on having the word of God brought to them by the old circuit riders, by the reading of church services in private homes, and by sharing a minister with another church.

In November 1956, she reported the opening of land between Seashore State Park and Crystal Lake.

Kyle was married to William Emmett Kyle (1896–1972). They had three daughters. She was one of the founding members of the Princess Anne County Historical Society. She died in Virginia Beach.

== Literary works ==
Kyle wrote Historical Data on Little Neck Section of Princess Anne County, which was published in 1960. The History of Eastern Shore Chapel and Lynnhaven Parish, 1642–1969 appeared in 1969.

The Witch of Pungo and Other Historical Stories of the Early Colonies is a fiction book written for children, with the tales of seven folk tales from the history of Princess Anne County, including "Christmas at Adam Thoroughgood's House" and Blackbeard's Treasure. The historical background of each story is provided at the end of the story. The Witch of Pungo is based on Grace Sherwood, a woman who was accused of witchcraft in February 1706 and tried by ducking: "If Grace would float in consecrated water, as she did after being ducked in the Lynnhaven River off what is now called Witchduck Point, then she was deemed guilty of witchcraft". Sherwood spent seven years in jail and then lived on a farm granted by Governor Alexander Spotswood. The book was published in 1973 by Printcraft Press, Portsmouth, Virginia, reissued in 1978 in Four O'Clock Farms Publishing Company, and again in 1988.

Kyle's book Ram Lam (1975) was published by the Four O'Clock Farms Publishing Company. Her memoir, My Virginia Childhood: The Years 1903-1914, was published in 1976. Other works included A Country Woman's Scrapbook (1980) and A Country Woman's Christmas (1993).
