= Virginia Beach Airport =

- IATA: none; ICAO: none; FAA LID: 42VA

Summary
- Airport type: Private
- Owner/Operator: Military Aviation Museum
- Location: Pungo, Virginia
- Built: 1969
- Elevation AMSL: 15 ft (4.6 m)
- Coordinates: 36°40′41.54″N 76°01′58.75″W
- Website: VA Beach Airport
- Interactive map of Virginia Beach Airport

Runways
Direction	Length		Surface
Direction	ft	m	Surface
11/29	5,000	1,524	Grass

The Virginia Beach Airport (FAA LID: 42VA) is a private civilian airfield located in the Pungo Borough of Virginia Beach, Virginia.

It is the home of the Military Aviation Museum, which uses it to maintain, display, and fly vintage and replica warbirds; the aircraft are primarily from the World War II era, but they range from the 1910s to the 1950s. The facilities include an Art Deco main building, one grass landing strip, a checkered water tower, and a large number of medium-size hangars.

There are no commercial airline services at Virginia Beach Airport; most people getting from outside of Virginia to Virginia Beach use Norfolk International Airport in nearby Norfolk instead.

== History ==
The airport was created in 1969 by four local pilots; the original concept was for a small airport, including a runway, hotel, restaurant, a small terminal, and several hangars.

These intentions fairly quickly did not pan out, and so much of the land was returned to agriculture. The runway did remain active, and was used for crop dusting planes and banner towing planes.

In the early 2000s, the founder of the Military Aviation Museum, Gerald "Jerry" Yagen, purchased the property as a home for his collection of warbirds, and began planning the creation of the Museum.
