= Bell L-39 =

American experimental aircraft

L-39
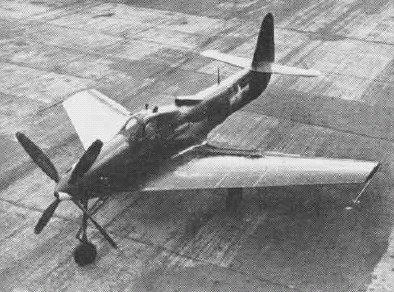
- L-39-2 with fully swept wings

General information
- Type: Experimental aircraft
- National origin: United States
- Manufacturer: Bell Aircraft
- Status: Retired
- Primary user: NACA
- Number built: 2

History
- First flight: April 23, 1946
- Developed from: Bell P-63 Kingcobra

The Bell L-39 was an experimental aircraft used to test the characteristics of swept wings.

== Design and development ==
After the end of World War II, the United States military took interest in German aerodynamic research into swept wings. To test the low-speed characteristics of swept wings, the US Navy contracted Bell Aircraft to modify two P-63 Kingcobras (Note: Sources disagree on which variant the L-39s were modified from. Some claim that they were P-63A-9-BEs, others claim that they were P-63C-5-BEs, and at least one claims that one of the aircraft was the XP-63N.) as test aircraft for use by NACA. These aircraft, assigned the bureau numbers 90060 and 90061, (Note: Some sources give the bureau numbers to be 90061 and 90062, but this is in error.) were designated L-39-1 and L-39-2, based on Bell's code letter "L" and the aircraft's model number "39". Both aircraft were fitted with straight inner wing panels and 35 degree swept outer panels derived from the P-63E, both sections lacking dihedral. A pair of cameras were mounted behind the canopy to film the airflow pattern, which was indicated by tufts of string attached to the wings. Leading-edge slots could be bolted into the wings in different configurations. The main landing gear was fixed, with only the nose gear being retractable. All armament was removed from the aircraft, and the rear canopies were blacked out.

A ventral fin extension was fitted under the rear fuselage of the L-39-1 after its first flight. During subsequent test flights of L-39-1 the center of gravity was found to be too far forward. To remedy the problem the fuselage was extended by four feet and a lighter propeller was installed. At the time, a surplus three-bladed propeller cost twice as much as a surplus P-39 Airacobra, therefore two P-39Q-10-BEs were purchased for their propellers. L-39-2 was fitted with the fuselage extension and an even larger ventral fin extension from the start.

== Operational history ==
The L-39-1 made its first flight at Niagara Falls Airport on April 23, 1946, with Bell test pilot Alvin M. "Tex" Johnston at the controls. Early flights revealed several handling problems, which were subsequently fixed with modifications to the fuselage and tail. The L-39 was noted to have poor stall characteristics, stalling with little warning. Different leading-edge slot configurations were tested, and pilots found that a 40 percent slotted wing improved stall characteristics. 60 and 80 percent slotted wings were found to have excellent stall characteristics, while 20 and 100 degree slots were unsatisfactory.

The L-39 program was halted on August 26, 1946, and the L-39-1 was sent to Langley Field, where it was used for wind tunnel testing. The L-39-2 was retained by Bell to support their X-2 program, being modified with a new fully swept wing of a design intended for the X-2. On December 12, 1949, both aircraft were transferred to the Lewis Research Center before being sold for scrap in 1955.

== Variants ==
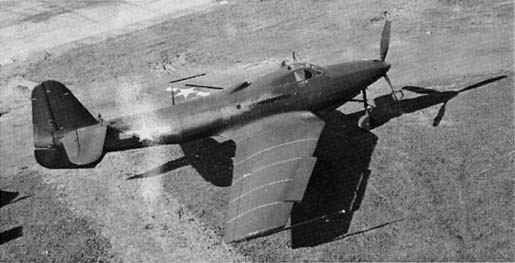
L-39-1 with its ventral tail extension visible.

L-39-1
First aircraft
L-39-2
Second aircraft, later modified with fully swept wings.

== Specifications (L-39-1, initial configuration) ==
Data from

General characteristics

- Crew: 1
- Wingspan: 33.60 ft (10.24 m)
- Wing area: 250 sq ft (23 m^{2})
- Gross weight: 8,700 lb (3,946 kg)
- Propellers: 3-bladed, 10 ft 4.5 in (3.162 m) diameter

== See also ==
Related development

- Bell P-63 Kingcobra
- Bell X-2

Related lists

- List of experimental aircraft
