= Military Aviation Museum =

Aviation museum in Virginia, United States

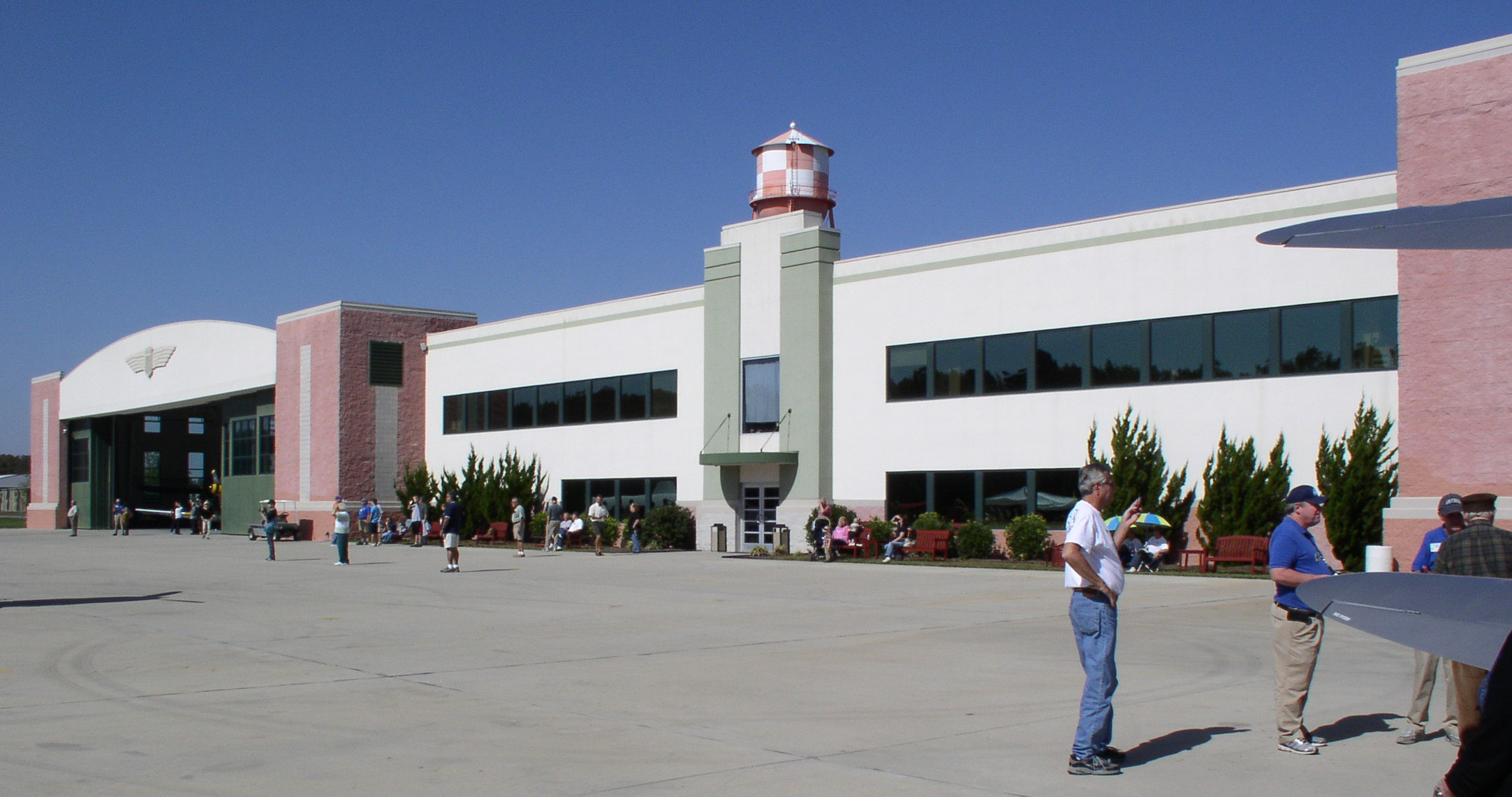
- US Air Force hangar and main building

- Location within Virginia
- Established: 2005 (Opened to the Public in 2008)
- Location: Virginia Beach Airport, Virginia Beach, Virginia; 1341 Princess Anne Road
- Coordinates: 36.6788°N 76.0281°W
- Type: Aviation museum
- Collection size: Over 70 vintage airplanes
- Visitors: >80,000 (2019)
- Founder: Gerald "Jerry" Yagen
- Director: Keegan Chetwynd
- Website: http://www.militaryaviationmuseum.org/

The Military Aviation Museum is located in Virginia Beach, Virginia, and houses one of the world's largest private collections of warbirds in flying condition. It includes examples from Germany, France, Italy, Russia, the United Kingdom, and the United States, from both World War I and World War II. The collection contains aircraft ranging from the 1910s to the early 1950s.

The museum's work includes the preservation and restoration of the aircraft, and it also conducts live demonstrations of the aircraft in the form of twice-yearly airshows. The collection includes both a reference library as well as artifacts and materials to illustrate the historic context of the aircraft in the collection.

== History ==
The museum was founded by Gerald "Jerry" Yagen in 2005, and the museum's hangars were opened to the public in 2008. He had been collecting and restoring warbirds since the mid-1990s, starting with a Curtiss P-40E Kittyhawk.

=== Difficulties in 2013 ===
In June 2013, Yagen announced that the museum and its collection would be sold due to financial difficulties. An article in The Virginian-Pilot reported that Yagen had said, "I'm subsidizing it heavily every year, and my business no longer allows me to do that financially, and therefore I don't have a solution for it".

However, the announced sale of the museum and aircraft was premature. Ultimately, several aircraft were sold, but the museum was able to remain in operation. Since the sales in 2013, additional aircraft (including a projected replacement de Havilland Dragon Rapide) have been acquired and are under restoration to fly.

In October 2024, Yagen donated his 70 aircraft, 130 acres (0.53 km^{2}) and $30 million to the museum.

== Facilities ==
The museum is housed at its own small private grass airfield, the Virginia Beach Airport, in the Pungo area of Virginia Beach, Virginia.

The complex includes two display hangars (one on each side of the main museum building) in one group of buildings, and in another group, a replica World War I-era wooden hangar, a maintenance hangar (entirely new, but an exact replica of a 1937 Works Progress Administration design), a restored authentic pre-WWII Luftwaffe metal hangar from Poland, and a set of three identical storage hangars painted to resemble British World War II hangars.

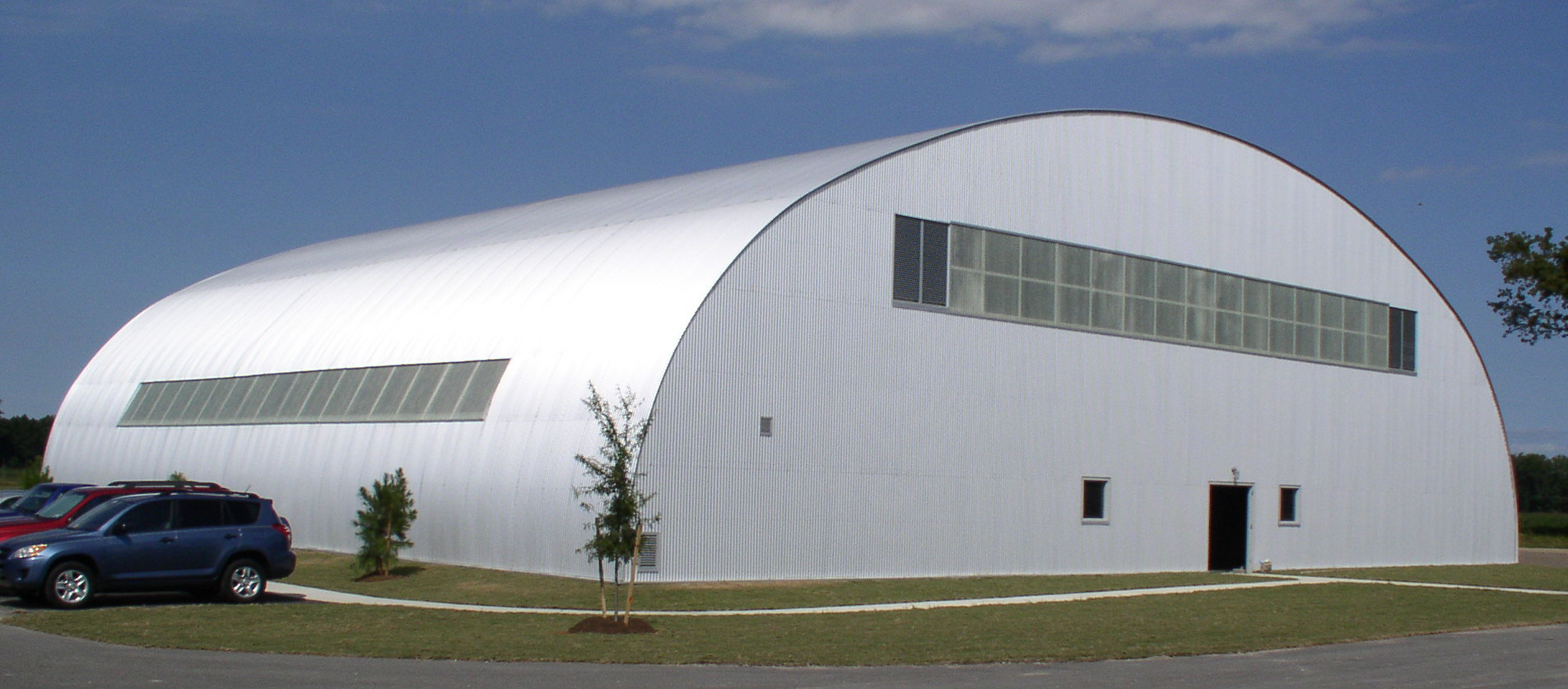
Restored original Luftwaffe hangar

The Luftwaffe hangar was built in 1934 at Cottbus Air Base. The museum purchased the hangar in 2004 after the base was closed during the reunification of Germany. It was dismantled and shipped to Virginia Beach and construction started in 2010 and finished in the fall of 2012 at the museum where it now houses the museum's Luftwaffe aircraft.

The museum's airfield control tower is an ex-8th AAF World War II tower from RAF Goxhill. The two-story brick and concrete structure was completely disassembled from its original site in the UK and shipped to Virginia. Reassembly was completed in 2018. In the UK, some similar towers are now historically protected; this is the only such original control tower in the US.

The complex also includes a large orange and white checked water tower, which is visible from a considerable distance and provides a useful landmark for both ground and air travelers.

There is a dinosaur park at the entrance to the museum, which is free and open to the public.

== Restorations and Reproductions ==
Some of the aircraft obtained in an un-restored state are handled at the museum's related repair facility, the Fighter Factory (below); others are restored elsewhere by contractors with specialized capabilities, including:

- Meier Motors
- AV Specs Limited
- Pioneer Aero
- Light Retouch

The museum is also connected to the Aviation Institute of Maintenance, which is currently building a small fleet of various World War I replicas, as an exercise for the students, to add to the museum's collection. The current batch includes a Morane Saulnier AI, a Nieuport 11, a Nieuport 17, a Nieuport 24, a Sopwith Pup, a Sopwith Camel, a Sopwith 1½ Strutter, and a deHavilland D.H.2. Both the Morane Saulnier AI and the Sopwith 1½ Strutter have arrived at the museum.

=== The Fighter Factory ===
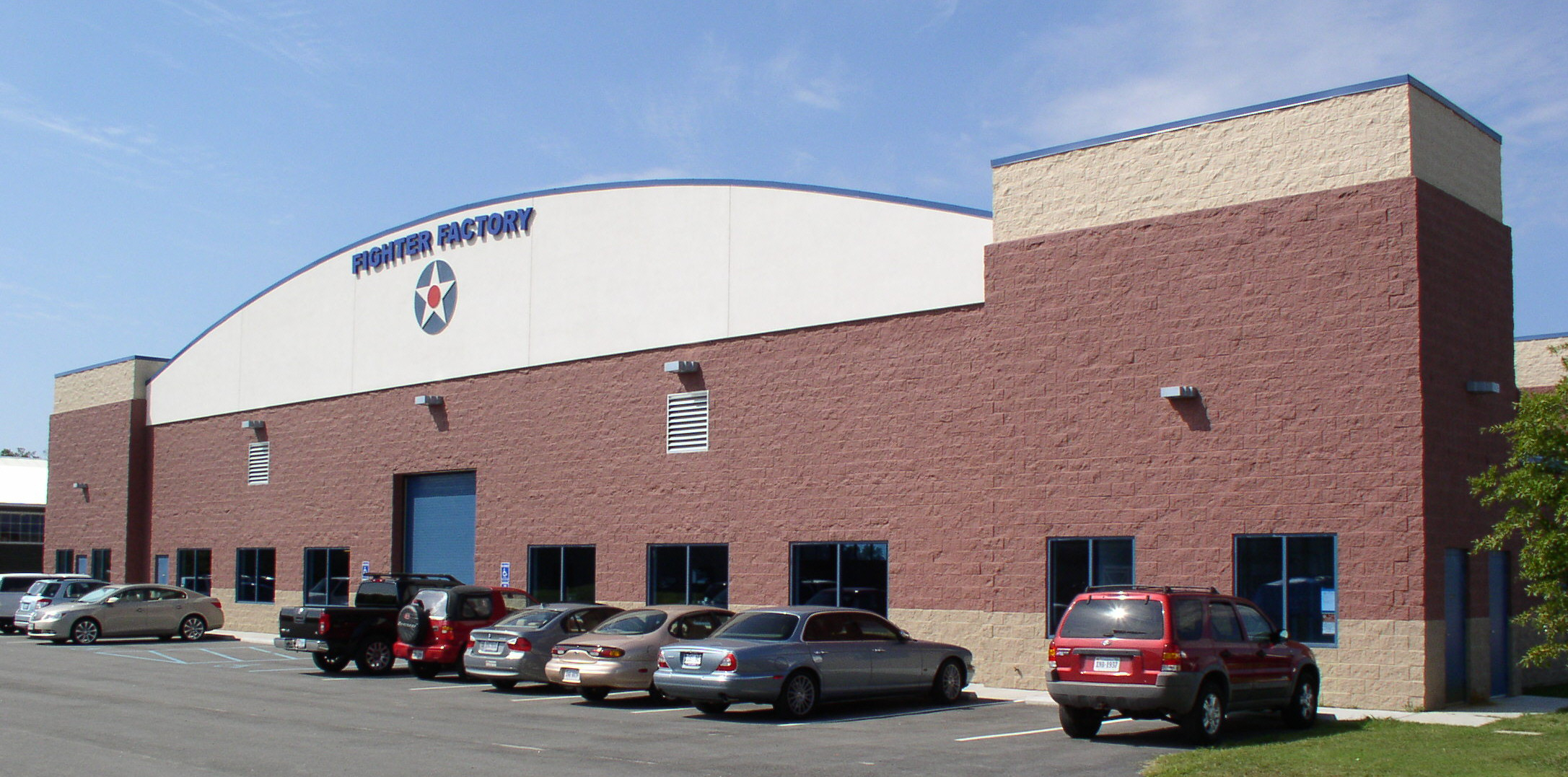
Fighter Factory facility in the maintenance hangar at the museum

Associated with the museum is an aircraft restoration and maintenance organization, called The Fighter Factory, which started in 1996 to restore the collection's first aircraft (the P-40E).

It was originally located at Norfolk Airport, and later moved to premises at the Suffolk Municipal Airport in Suffolk, Virginia. It currently operates two facilities: one in Suffolk and a new facility (in the purpose-built hangar) at the museum.

== Programs ==
The museum offers guests the opportunity to fly in either the Waco YMF-5 or the Stearman N2S-3. Both of the aircraft are open cockpit biplanes.

== See also ==
- List of aerospace museums
- Virginia Beach Airport
