= Pungo, Virginia =

Pungo
- Neighborhood
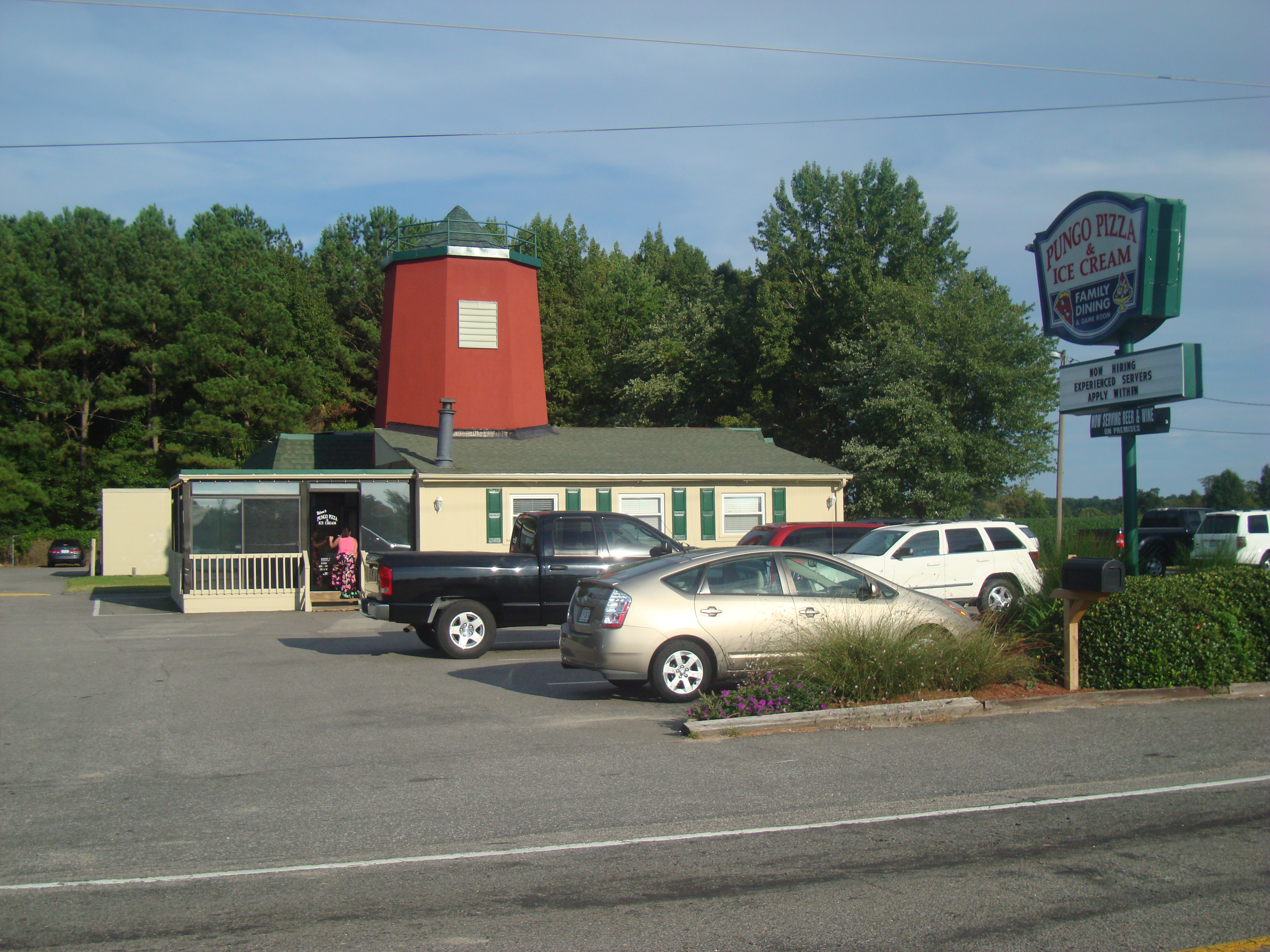
- Pungo Pizza in Pungo

- Location within the state of Virginia Pungo (the United States)
- Coordinates: 36°43′25″N 76°1′4″W
- Country: United States
- State: Virginia
- Independent city: Virginia Beach
- Time zone: UTC−5 (Eastern (EST))
  - Summer (DST): UTC−4 (EDT)
- ZIP Code: 23457
- Area code: 757

Pungo is a rural community located in the southern part of the independent city of Virginia Beach, Virginia and was one of the seven original boroughs when the City of Virginia Beach was created in 1963. The area derives its name from a local Indian tribe, the Machipungo, a branch of the Chesapeake tribe. It was named for a local Indian chief, Machiopungo. Because the community is located in an independent city, there is no individual census for the neighborhood, which was originally part of Princess Anne County until 1963, when the entire county became part of Virginia Beach. Like much of southern Virginia Beach, the area is surrounded by farmland.

Pungo is known for its Pungo Strawberry Festival, which was held there every spring until the early 2020s, and the Military Aviation Museum, which has a large collection of vintage warbirds. Also well known is the story of Grace Sherwood, known as the "Witch of Pungo". Nearby is Nimmo United Methodist Church, which was built in 1791 and expanded in the early 1990s; it is the oldest church with the original foundation in the area. Bishop Francis Asbury preached there.

== Location ==
Pungo is located about ten miles (16 km) south of the heart of Virginia Beach, and is about 15 miles (24 km) southeast of the Norfolk International Airport. The "heart" of the Pungo area is its only intersection with a stoplight at Princess Anne Road and Indian River Road. Pungo lies south of Sandbridge road, which serves as Virginia Beach's "Green Line." This helps to assure that Pungo will remain rural, as opposed to its neighbors in the Princess Anne area, such as Courthouse, Red Mill and Lago Mar, which lie just north of the Green Line.

== Witch of Pungo ==
Grace Sherwood (1660–1740) is a local legend in the old Princess Anne County and Pungo, Virginia. The Associated Press reports that she was an unconventional woman in a number of ways, which drew attention to her. She was first accused in 1698 of having bewitched a neighbor's crop of cotton. Allegations against her grew, and the Princess Anne County government, along with her accusers decided that she would be tested by ducking, with Sherwood's consent. She was taken to what is now known as Witch Duck Point, tied crossbound, and tossed into the river, but she managed to untie herself and swim to the surface.

== Strawberry Festival ==
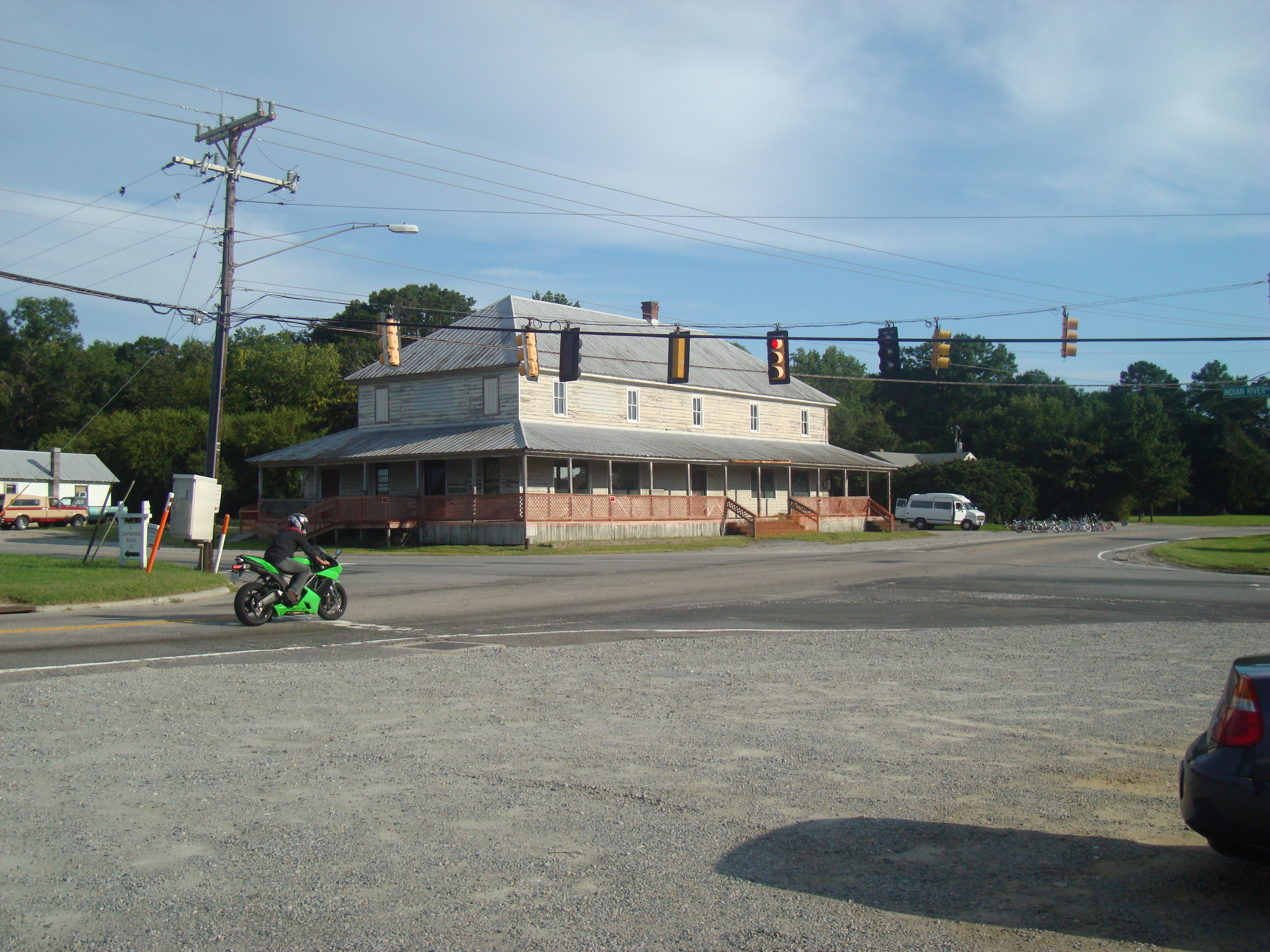
The only stoplight in Pungo. The defunct Munden's store is in the background

The Pungo Strawberry Festival began in 1983 and is held every year for three days on Memorial Day weekend. Attendance at the festival's inception in 1983 was 50,000, and now it regularly attracts over 120,000 visitors. Strawberries prepared over 50 different ways are featured. Activities include a pie eating contest, strawberry bake-off, continuous entertainment on three stages, a parade, one of the largest carnivals on the east coast, livestock show and sale, a multimillion-dollar military display, pig races, youth art show, a 4-H area, pony rides, bands, and arts and craft booths. The sponsoring organization is a non-profit. All proceeds from the Festival are donated to non-profit community and service organizations. There are many food, youth, civic, and service organization booths. Each year, the festival has an honorary mayor, first lady, and witch of Pungo. In 2013, Fox News ranked it as the 3rd best spring food festival in America.

The Festival was cancelled in 2020-21 due to the COVID-19 pandemic, and it has not been held since.

== Military Aviation Museum ==
Pungo is also home to the Military Aviation Museum, located at the Virginia Beach Airport in Pungo.
