= Grace Sherwood =

American woman, convicted and posthumously pardoned for witchcraft

Grace White Sherwood
- Born: Grace White; 1660 likely Pungo, Colony of Virginia
- Died: 1740 (aged 79–80) likely Pungo
- Monuments: Statue of Grace Sherwood located at 36.866139°N 76.131811°W
- Other name: The Witch of Pungo
- Occupations: Farmer; healer; midwife
- Criminal charge: Witchcraft
- Criminal status: Posthumously granted an informal pardon

Grace White Sherwood (1660–1740), called the Witch of Pungo, is the last person known to have been convicted of witchcraft in Virginia.

A farmer, healer, and midwife, she was accused by her neighbors of transforming herself into a cat, damaging crops, and causing the death of livestock. She was charged with witchcraft several times. The court ordered that Sherwood's guilt or innocence be determined by ducking her in water. If she sank, she was innocent; if she did not, she was guilty. Sherwood floated to the surface and may have spent almost eight years in jail before being released.

Sherwood lived in Pungo, Princess Anne County (Note: Lower Norfolk County before 1691) (today part of Virginia Beach), and married James Sherwood, a planter, in 1680. The couple had three sons: John, James, and Richard. Her first case was in 1697; she was accused of casting a spell on a bull, resulting in its death, but the matter was dismissed by the agreement of both parties. The following year she was accused of witchcraft by two neighbors; she supposedly bewitched the hogs and cotton crop of one of them. Sherwood sued for slander after each accusation, but her lawsuits were unsuccessful and her husband had to pay court costs. In 1706 she was convicted of witchcraft and was incarcerated. Freed from prison by 1714, she recovered her property from Princess Anne County (her husband had died in 1701). She did not remarry, and lived on her farm until her death in 1740 at the age of about 80.

On July 10, 2006, the 300th anniversary of Sherwood's conviction, Governor Tim Kaine granted an informal pardon to "officially restore [her] good name", recognizing that she was wrongfully convicted. A statue depicting her was erected near Sentara Bayside Hospital on Independence Boulevard in Virginia Beach, close to the site of the colonial courthouse where she was tried. She is sculpted alongside a raccoon, representing her love of animals, and carrying a basket containing garlic and rosemary, in recognition of her knowledge of herbal healing.

== Family background ==
Sherwood was born in 1660 to John and Susan White. John White was a carpenter and farmer of Scottish descent; it is uncertain whether he was born in America. Susan was English by birth; their daughter Grace was born in Virginia, probably in Pungo.

In April 1680 Grace White married a respected small-farm landowner, James Sherwood, in the Lynnhaven Parish Church. The couple had three sons: John, James, and Richard. John White gave the Sherwoods 50 acres (20 ha) of land when they married, and on his death in 1681 left them the remainder of his 145 acres (59 ha) farm. The Sherwood family was poor, and lived in an area inhabited by small landowners or those with no land at all. In addition to farming, Grace Sherwood grew her own herbs, which she used to heal both people and animals. She also acted as a midwife. When James died in 1701, Grace inherited his property. She did not remarry.

No drawings or paintings of Sherwood exist, but contemporary accounts describe her as attractive and tall and possessing a sense of humor. Sherwood wore trousers instead of a dress while working on her farm. This was unusual for the time, as was her herb growing. The combination of clothing and good looks was said to attract men and upset their wives. Sherwood biographer and advocate Belinda Nash suggests that Sherwood's neighbors may have been jealous of Sherwood, and that the witchcraft tales may have been conjured up in an effort to remove her from, and subsequently get, her property. Sherwood was a party to at least a dozen lawsuits, in which she had to defend against accusations of witchcraft, or in which she sued her accusers for slander.

== Witchcraft and Virginia ==
The existence of witches and demonic forces was taken for granted by the American colonists—witchcraft was considered the work of the Devil. Colonists believed that witches could be identified by their strange behavior. As early as 1626, nineteen years after the founding of the Jamestown colony, a grand jury in Virginia sat to consider whether Goodwife Joan Wright was a witch—she had supposedly predicted the deaths of three women and had caused illness as revenge for not hiring her as midwife. No record of the outcome is extant.

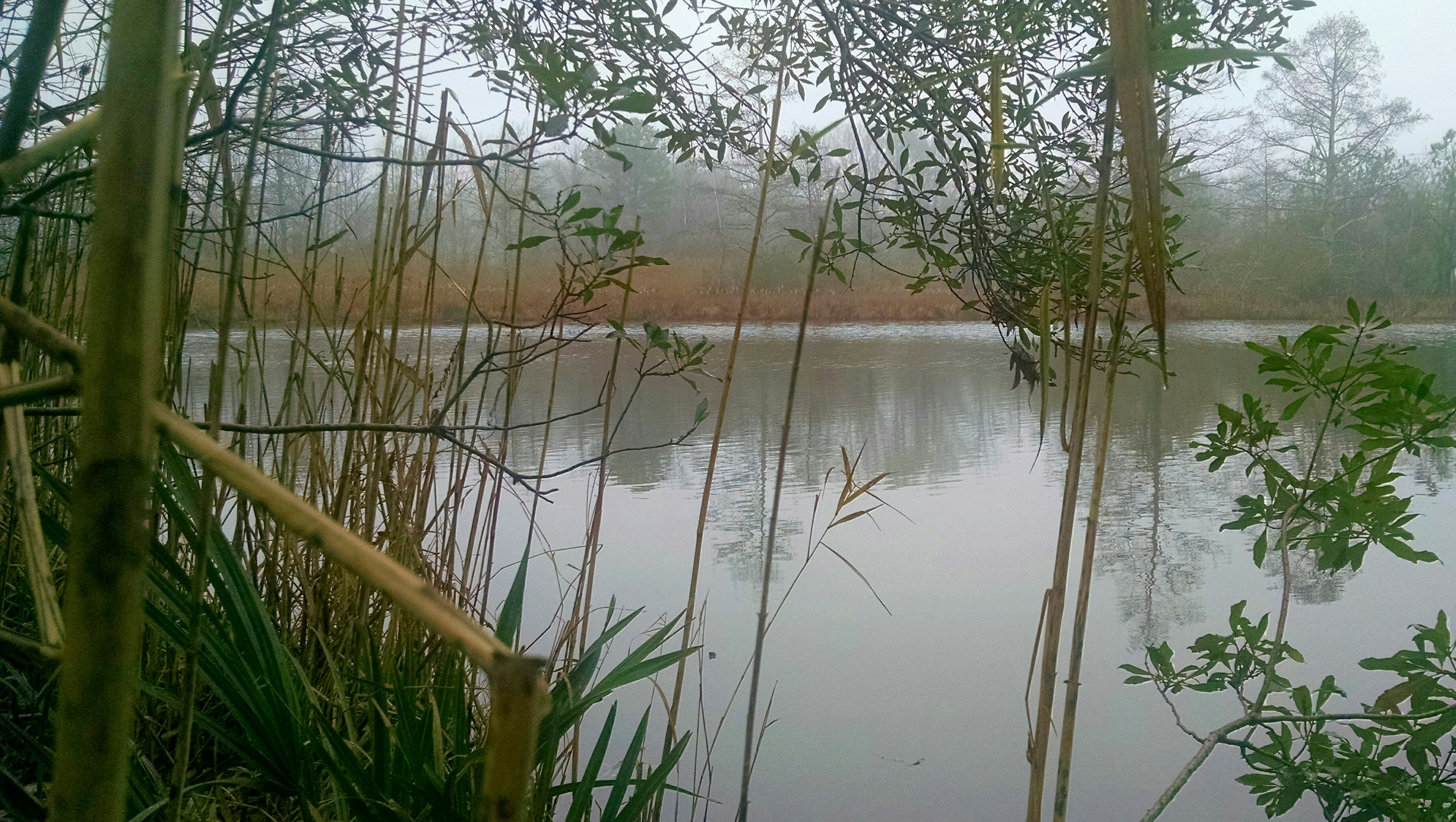
Asheville Bridge Creek, known as Muddy Creek when Grace Sherwood lived on its banks

Nevertheless, Virginia did not experience events of mass hysteria such as the Salem, Massachusetts witch trials in 1692–1693, in which 19 people were executed on allegations of sorcery, some years before the first accusations against Sherwood. Ecclesiastical influence in the courtroom was much less a factor in Virginia, where the clergy rarely participated in witchcraft trials, than in New England, where ministers took an active part. People's fears of witchcraft in Virginia were not based on their religious beliefs as much as they were rooted in folklore, although the two often intermingled. New England's Puritans had settled in towns, and community pressure helped contribute to witchcraft convictions. There were few such towns in Virginia, where the population mostly lived on farms and plantations, connected by water transport and scattered over a large area.

Virginia's lay and religious leaders were more interested in prosecuting offenses such as gossip, slander, and fornication, seeing them as threats to social stability. They wished to avoid witchcraft prosecutions, which were divisive. Virginia courts were reluctant to hear accusations of witchcraft and were even more reluctant to convict. Unlike the Salem witch trial courts, where the accused had to prove her innocence, in Virginia courts the accuser carried the burden of proof.

Further, Virginia courts generally ignored evidence said to have been obtained by supernatural means, whereas the New England courts were known to convict people based solely on it. Virginia required proof of guilt through either searches for witch's marks or ducking. Judges and magistrates would dismiss unsubstantiated cases of witchcraft and allow the accusers, who found themselves "under an ill tongue", to be sued for slander. Frances Pollard of the Virginia Historical Society states: "It was pretty clear that Virginia early on tried to discourage these charges being brought of witchcraft because they were so troublesome."

The southeastern corner of Virginia, around present-day Norfolk and Virginia Beach (where Pungo is located), saw more accusations of witchcraft than other areas. According to Leslie M. Newman, this may have been due to local poverty as there was no cultural elite to restrain such prosecutions.

Although few Virginia records survive from that era, 19 known witchcraft cases were brought in the colony during the 17th century, all but one of which ended in acquittal. The one conviction was a 1656 case of a man convicted of witchcraft and sentenced to 10 stripes and banishment from the county. There were no executions for witchcraft in Virginia. Nonetheless, as late as in 1736, Virginia's justices of the peace were reminded that witchcraft was still a crime, and that first offenders could expect to be pilloried and jailed for up to a year.

In 1745, John Craig, a Presbyterian minister in Augusta County, made assertions of witchcraft after his child and several of his animals died, and was in response accused of using evil arts to divine who was responsible. Neither he nor those who accused him brought their claims to court to face "unsympathetic magistrates", though prosecution for witchcraft was still possible in Virginia. The last Virginia witchcraft trial took place in 1802 in Brooke County, which is now in West Virginia. In that case, a couple claimed that a woman was a witch, an accusation ruled slanderous.

The trial by ducking (immersing the accused, bound, in water, to see if she would float) appears to have been used only once in Virginia, to try Sherwood. It was believed that, as water was considered pure, it would reject witches, causing them to float, whereas the innocent would sink.

== Accusations against Sherwood ==
=== Initial claims of witchcraft ===
The first accusation against Sherwood came to court in early 1697. Richard Capps alleged that she had used a spell to cause the death of his bull. The court made no decision, and the Sherwoods filed a defamation suit against Capps that was resolved by a settlement. In 1698, Sherwood was accused by her neighbor John Gisburne of enchanting his pigs and cotton crop. No court action followed this accusation, and another suit for defamation by the Sherwoods failed. In the same year Elizabeth Barnes alleged that Sherwood had assumed the form of a black cat, entered Barnes' home, jumped over her bed, drove and whipped her, and left via the keyhole. Again the allegation was unresolved, and again the subsequent defamation action was lost. For each of the failed actions, Sherwood and her husband had to pay court-related costs.

According to Richard Beale Davis in his journal article on witchcraft in Virginia, by this time "Princess Anne County had obviously grown tired of Mrs. Sherwood as a general nuisance". In 1705, Sherwood was involved in a fight with her neighbor, Elizabeth Hill. Sherwood sued Hill and her husband for assault and battery, and on December 7, 1705, was awarded damages of twenty shillings (one pound sterling).

=== Trial by water ===
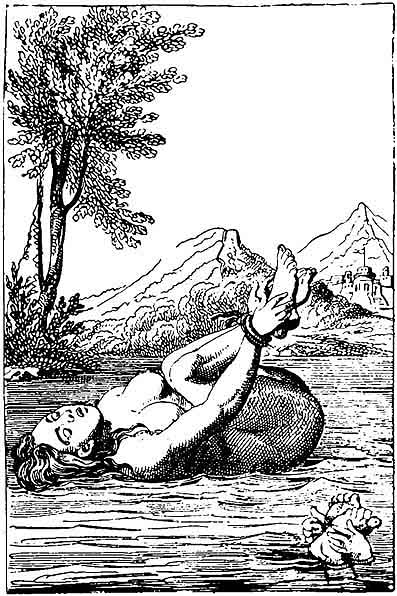
17th-century engraving of ducking similar to that of Sherwood

On January 3, 1706, the Hills accused Grace Sherwood of witchcraft. She failed to answer the charge in court, and on February 7, 1706, the court ordered her to appear on a charge of having bewitched Elizabeth Hill, causing a miscarriage. In March 1706 the Princess Anne County justices sought to empanel two juries, both made up of women. The first was ordered to search Sherwood's home for waxen or baked figures that might indicate she was a witch. The second was ordered to look for "demon suckling teats" by examining her. In both instances, reluctance on the part of the local residents made it difficult to form a jury and both juries refused to carry out the searches. On March 7, 1706, Sherwood was examined by a jury of 12 "ancient and knowing women" appointed to look for markings on her body that might be brands of the Devil. They discovered two "marks not like theirs or like those of any other woman". The forewoman of this jury was the same Elizabeth Barnes who had previously accused Sherwood of witchcraft.

Neither the colonial authorities in Williamsburg nor the local court in Princess Anne were willing to declare Sherwood a witch. Those in Williamsburg considered the charge overly vague, and on April 16 instructed the local court to examine the case more fully. For each court appearance, Sherwood had to travel 16 miles (26 km) from her farm in Pungo to where the court was sitting.

On May 2, 1706, the county justices noted that while no particular act of maleficium had been alleged against Sherwood, there was "great cause of suspicion". Consequently, the Sheriff of Princess Anne County took Sherwood into custody, though Sherwood could give bond for her appearance and good behavior. Maximilian Boush, a warden of Lynnhaven Parish Church, was the prosecutor in Sherwood's case. On July 5, 1706, the justices ordered a trial by ducking to take place, with Sherwood's consent, but heavy rains caused a postponement until July 10, as they feared the wet weather might harm her health. Sherwood was taken inside Lynnhaven Parish Church, placed on a stool and ordered to ask for forgiveness for her witchery. She replied, "I be not a witch, I be a healer."

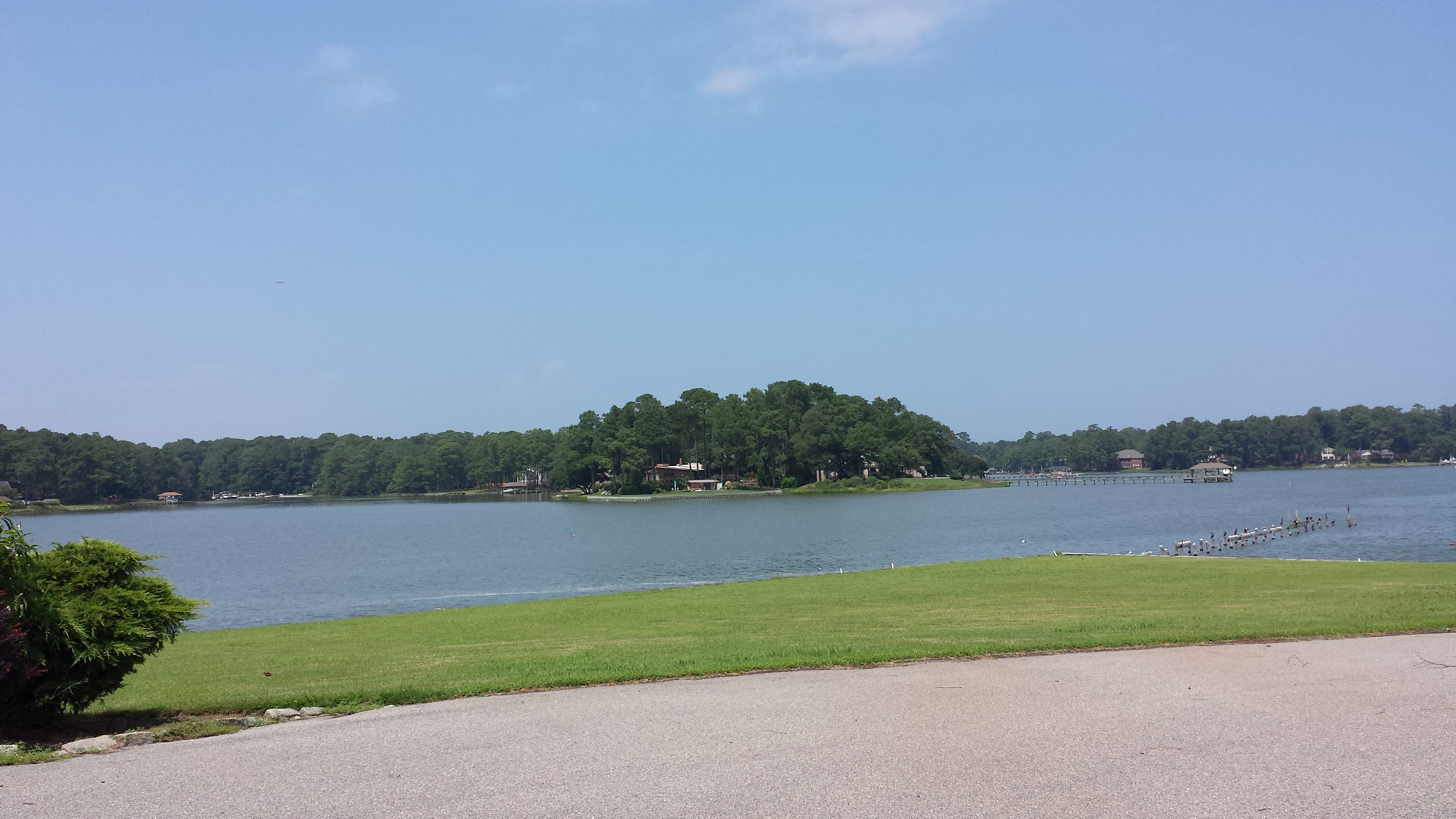
Witch Duck Bay as seen from the very end of North Witchduck Road on Witch Duck Point in Virginia Beach, looking north. This is the place where Grace Sherwood was ducked.

At about 10 a.m. on July 10, 1706, Sherwood was taken down a dirt lane now known as Witchduck Road, to a plantation near the mouth of the Lynnhaven River. News had spread, and the event attracted people from all over the colony, who began to shout "Duck the witch!" According to the principles of trial by water, if Sherwood floated she would be deemed guilty of witchcraft; if she did not, she would be innocent. It was not intended that Sherwood drown; the court had ordered that care be taken to preserve her life.

Five women of Lynnhaven Parish Church examined Sherwood's naked body on the shoreline for any devices she might have to free herself, and then covered her with a sack. Six of the justices that had ordered the ducking rowed in one boat 200 yards (180 m) out in the river, and in another were the sheriff, the magistrate, and Sherwood. Just before she was pushed off the boat Sherwood is said to have stated, under clear skies, "Before this day be through you will all get a worse ducking than I." Bound across the body—her right thumb to her left big toe and her left thumb to her right big toe – she was "cast into the river", and quickly floated to the surface. The sheriff then tied a 13-pound (5.9 kg) Bible around her neck. This caused her to sink, but she untied herself, and returned to the surface, convincing many spectators she was a witch. As Sherwood was pulled out of the water a downpour reportedly started, drenching the onlookers. Several women who subsequently examined her for additional proof found "two things like titts on her private parts of a black coller [color]". She was jailed pending further proceedings.

=== Aftermath ===
What happened to Sherwood after her ducking is unclear as many court records have been lost. (Note: George Lincoln Burr's book Narrative of the Witchcraft Cases 1648–1706 reproduces the text of the surviving records relating to Sherwood and to other witchcraft cases, "a selection made and edited by a master hand from authentic, original documents". See Burstein 1961, p. 527) She served an unknown time in the jail next to Lynnhaven Parish Church, perhaps as long as seven years and nine months. She was ordered to be detained "to be brought to a future trial", but no record of another trial exists, so it is possible the charge was dismissed at some point. On September 1, 1708, she was ordered to pay Christopher Cocke 600 pounds (270 kg) of tobacco (Note: Then used as currency in Virginia.) for a reason not indicated in surviving records, but there is no mention of the payment. She appears to have been released some time in or before 1714, since in that year she paid back taxes on her 145-acre (59 ha) property—which Virginia Lieutenant Governor Alexander Spotswood helped her to recover from Princess Anne County—on the banks of Muddy Creek off what is now Muddy Creek Road. She lived the remainder of her life quietly until her death in 1740, aged about 80. She is believed to have died in August or September 1740. Her will was proved on October 1, 1740; it noted that she was a widow. She left five shillings each to her sons James and Richard and everything else to her eldest son John.

According to legend, Sherwood's sons put her body near the fireplace, and a wind came down the chimney. Her body disappeared amid the embers, with the only clue being a cloven hoofprint. Sherwood lies in an unmarked grave under some trees in a field near the intersection of Pungo Ferry Road and Princess Anne Road in Virginia Beach. Stories about the Devil taking her body, unnatural storms, and loitering black cats quickly arose after her death, and local men killed every feline they could find; this widespread killing of cats might have caused the infestation of rats and mice recorded in Princess Anne County in 1743. Her home on Muddy Creek stood for over 200 years. After being burned several times in the 20th century by vandals, all that was left in 2002 were the brick chimneys, which were bulldozed in November 2002. All that remains are a few bricks and part of the foundation, which is overgrown. The property is now owned by the Federal Government as part of Back Bay National Wildlife Refuge.

== Legacy ==
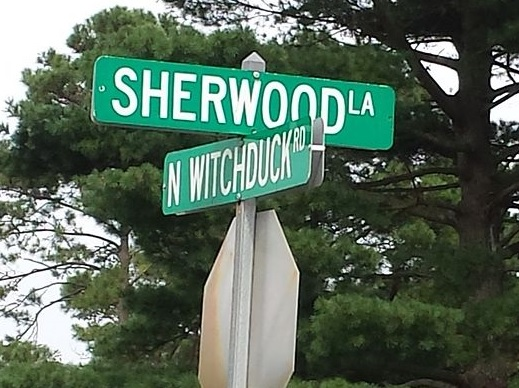
Street sign in the Witch Duck Point housing area of Virginia Beach. Many things are named "Witchduck" or "Witch Duck" in Virginia Beach, and both spellings are in use.

Grace Sherwood's case was little known until Virginia Beach historian and author Louisa Venable Kyle wrote a children's book about her in 1973. Called The Witch of Pungo, it is a collection of seven local folk tales written as fiction, although based on historical events. Sherwood's story was adapted for Cry Witch, a courtroom drama at Colonial Williamsburg, the restored early capital of Virginia.

A statue by California sculptor Robert Cunningham depicting Sherwood with a raccoon and a basket of rosemary was unveiled on April 21, 2007, on the site of the present-day Sentara Bayside Hospital, close to the sites of both the colonial courthouse and the ducking point. The raccoon represents Sherwood's love of animals and the rosemary her knowledge of herbal healing. A Virginia Department of Historic Resources marker (K-276) was erected in 2002, about 25 yards (23 m) from Sherwood's statue. The place of her watery test and the adjacent land are named Witch Duck Bay and Witch Duck Point. (Note: Witch Duck Bay location: 36.881°N 76.117°W) A portion of Virginia State Route 190 in Virginia Beach, a north–south thoroughfare on its western side which traverses Interstate 264 at exit numbers 14–16, has been named "Witchduck Road". Other commemorations in Virginia Beach include Sherwood Lane and Witch Point Trail. In 2014, a memorial marker was placed at a herb garden of the Old Donation Episcopal Church, Sherwood's former parish church, which is in Virginia Beach. A local legend in Virginia Beach states that all of the rosemary growing there came from a single plant Sherwood carried in an eggshell from England. (Note: While it was common at the time to protect seedlings in eggshells, this tale appears to be a variant of another legend that she once ran out of rosemary and rowed an eggshell to a ship in the harbor, bewitched the lone person on board, and sailed in a single night to and from England. Another version of the story describes her sailing to the Mediterranean in an eggshell. See Campbell 1934 and Harpers 1884, pp. 99–102)

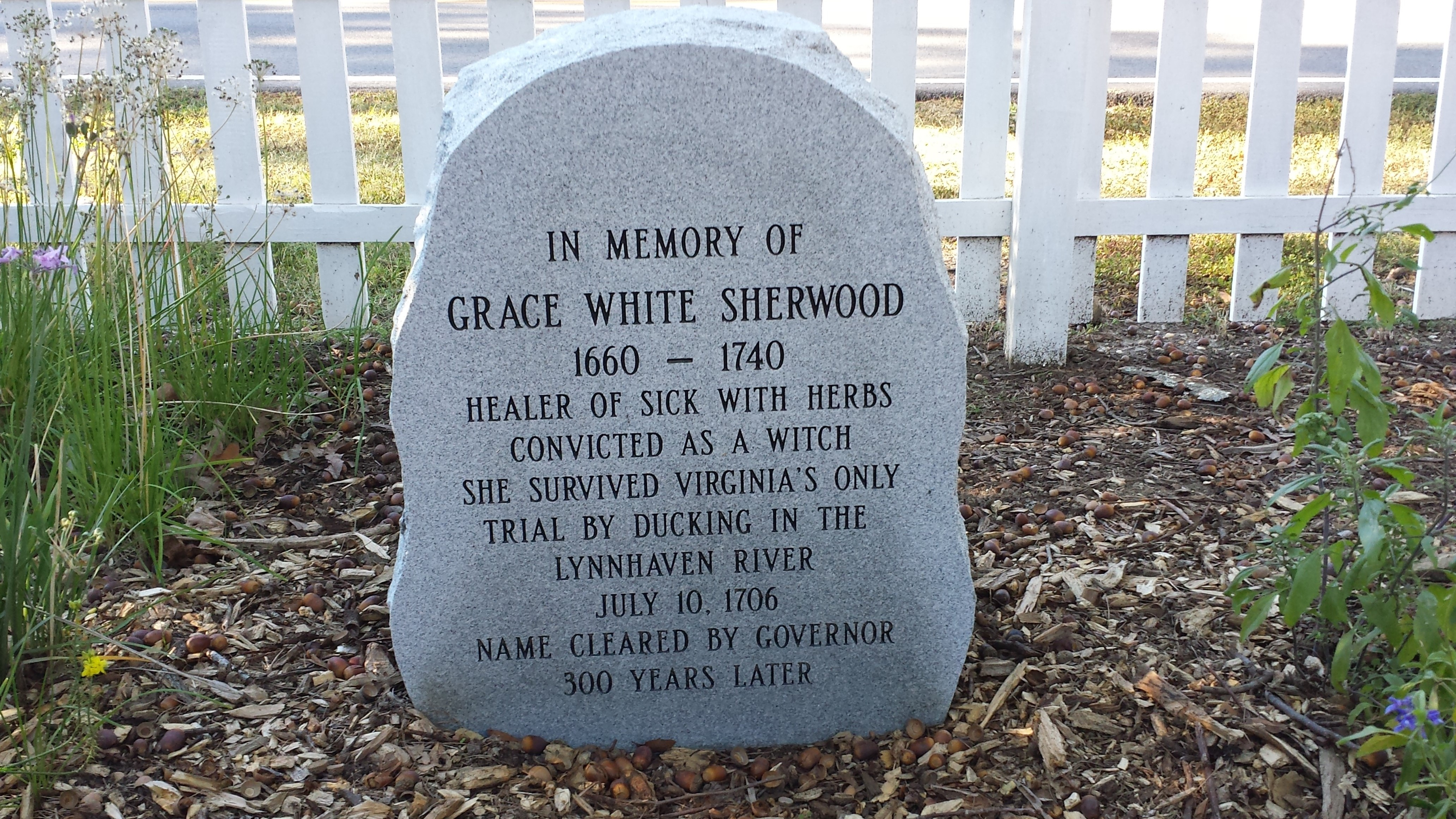
Memorial marker for Sherwood

Belinda Nash, in addition to writing a biography of Sherwood, worked tirelessly to get her pardoned. Governor Tim Kaine granted an informal pardon to "officially restore the good name of Grace Sherwood" on July 10, 2006, the 300th anniversary of her conviction. Annual reenactments of the ducking have taken place since 2006. No one is actually ducked in these events, which embark from a spot across from Ferry Plantation House along Cheswick Lane, which is very close to Witch Duck Bay. According to local residents, a strange moving light, said to be Sherwood's restless spirit, still appears each July over the spot in Witch Duck Bay where Sherwood was thrown into the water.
