= History of Virginia Beach, Virginia =

History of a city in Virginia, US

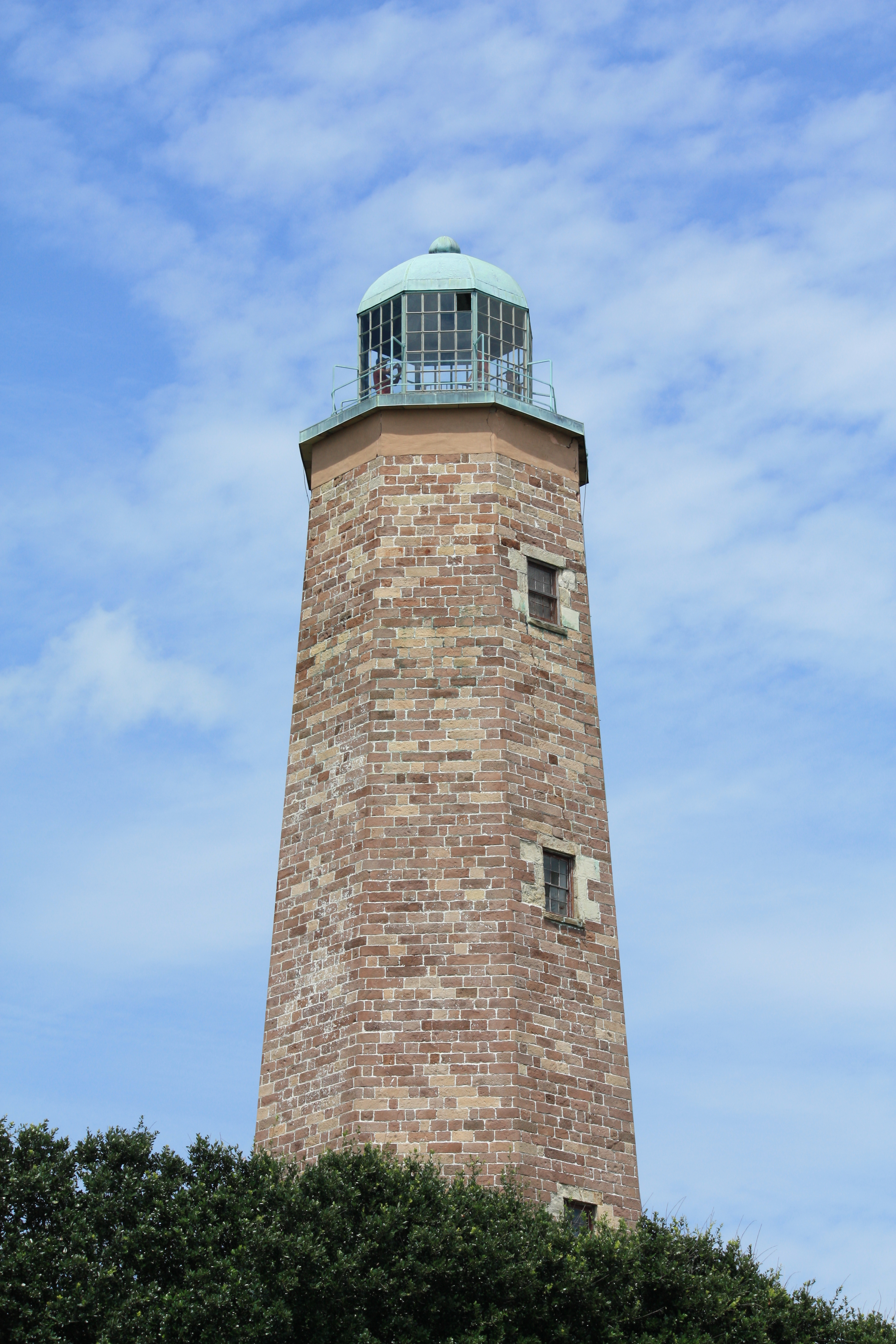
The Old Cape Henry Light, completed in 1792, was the first federal construction project under the United States Constitution

The history of Virginia Beach, Virginia, goes back to the Native Americans who lived in the area for thousands of years before the English colonists landed at Cape Henry in April 1607 and established their first permanent settlement at Jamestown a few weeks later. The Colonial Virginia period extended until 1776 and the American Revolution, and the area has been part of the Commonwealth of Virginia ever since.

Since 1634, area known today as Virginia Beach has been part of the same unit of local government, except for 11 years. In 1952, when 2-square-mile (5.2 km^{2}) resort Town of Virginia Beach became an independent city, followed by the rest of Princess Anne County which whom it was reunited and politically consolidated by mutual approval of residents to form a new independent city in 1963. Selecting the better-known name of the oceanfront strip area, Virginia Beach has since grown to become the most populated city in Hampton Roads, which are each linked by the Hampton Roads Beltway which crosses the harbor of Hampton Roads through two large bridge-tunnels.

== Native Americans ==
Chesepians were the Native American (American Indian) inhabitants of the area now known as South Hampton Roads in Virginia during the Woodland Period and later prior to the arrival of the English settlers in 1607. They occupied an area which is now the Norfolk, Portsmouth, Chesapeake and Virginia Beach areas. They were divided into five provinces or kingdoms: Weapemiooc, Chawanook, Secotan, Pomouic and Newsiooc, each ruled by a king or chief. To their west were the members of the Nansemond tribe.

The main village of the Chesepians was called Skicoak, located in the present independent city of Norfolk. The Chesepians also had two other towns (or villages), Apasus and Chesepioc, both near the Chesapeake Bay in what is now Virginia Beach. Of these, it is known that Chesepioc was located in the present Great Neck area. Archaeologists and other persons have found numerous Native American artifacts, such as arrowheads, stone axes, pottery, beads, and skeletons in Great Neck Point.

Politically, the area was dominated by the Virginia Peninsula-based Powhatan Confederacy. Although the Chesepians belonged to the same eastern-Algonquian speaking linguistic group as members of the Powhatan Confederacy across Hampton Roads, the archaeological evidence suggests that the original Chesepians belonged to another group, the Carolina Algonquian. Powhatan, whose real name was Wahunsunacock, was the most powerful chieftain in the Chesapeake Bay area, dominating more than 30 Algonquin-speaking tribes. The Chesepians did not belong to Powhatan's alliance, but instead defied him.

By 1607, around the time the first permanent English settlement was founded, the Chesaspeakes had united to fight the Powhatan Confederacy, suffering heavy losses. The last time the Chesaspeakes were mentioned in historical documents was in 1627. The Chesaspeakes have no pure descendants. Their tribe, totally defeated by Powhatan, was wiped out completely during this time frame by disease and attrition. According to William Strachey's The Historie of Travaile into Virginia Britanica (1612), the Chesepians were wiped out by Powhatan because Powhatan's priests had warned him that from the Chesapeake Bay a nation should arise, which should dissolve and give end to his empire. Local legend has it that an advisor to the Chief of the Powhatan tribe had a vision in which strangers from the East would come and take their land. Having no prior knowledge of the Europeans that would eventually land at Cape Henry, the Powhatans assumed the vision implicated the Chesepians. The Powhatans wiped out the entire Chesepeian tribe in a proactive defensive measure. Little did they know that the vision was correct. In 1607, a group of three ships (The Susan Constant, The Godspeed and The Discovery), led by Captain Christopher Newport, landed at Cape Henry. This group of 104 men and boys would move inland and establish the first permanent English settlement at Jamestown..

== European arrivals ==
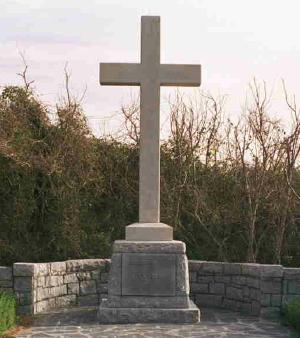
Cape Henry Memorial Cross near the site of the First Landing of English settlers in 1607

The Spanish sailed past the Chesapeake Bay and landed in Chincoteague (Virginia) in 1524. Spanish explorers also mapped the Cape Henry coast. The English soon followed with an exploration party under the auspices of Sir Walter Raleigh. His men explored the area between Cape Henry and Cape Lookout in July and August 1584. The first English colony was established by John White on Roanoke Island. However, the colony disappeared, giving rise to the legend of a mysterious Lost Colony. It took more than a dozen years before England sent another expedition to colonize the area, but this attempt failed as well.

The expedition that founded the first permanent settlement set sail on December 19, 1606 from Blackwall, England on three ships commanded by Captain Christopher Newport. It consisted of 105 men and boys sponsored by the proprietary London Company section of the Virginia Company. They had an unusually long voyage of 144 days. On April 26, 1607, they made their first landfall at Cape Henry, in the northeastern part of today's independent city of Virginia Beach, a point where the Chesapeake Bay meets the Atlantic Ocean. It was named in honor of Henry Frederick, Prince of Wales, the eldest son of King James I of England. However the settlers left the area under orders from England to seek a site further inland which would be more sheltered from ships of competing European countries.

Today, the site of their "First Landing" is within the boundaries of Joint Expeditionary Base East, a Navy installation used for training by the Army, U.S. Army, and Marines. A memorial cross near the landing site and the historic Cape Henry Light are accessible to the general public. First Landing State Park (formerly Seashore State Park) nearby was named to commemorate this event.

In addition to the landing site itself, a nearby settlement called Henry Town near the mouth of the Lynnhaven River was first described by name in a 1613 letter by the Virginia's lieutenant governor, Samuel Argall, who wrote of sending a fishing ship "to Henries Towne for the reliefe of such men as were there." Other extant documents mention several forts at the mouth of the Chesapeake Bay as early as 1610, possibly including Henry Town. These records indicate that settlement at Henry Town was contemporary with the settlement at Jamestown. However, most of the archaeological finds at the Henry Town site date from the middle rather than the early 17th century. Some discoveries suggest that the site is connected to Adam Thoroughgood's nearby tobacco plantation, which dates to about 1635.

== Norfolk County ==
The first written record of the name "Norfolk" is in the land books. It says: at court houlden in the Lower County of New Norfolke the 15th May 1637 [present:] Adam Thorowgood Esq.r. John Sibsey, Edward Windham, William Julian, Francis Mason and Robert Cramm were also present. Thorowgood was commander and presiding justice of the two distinct parishes. He was an important figure in the early history of Virginia Beach.

Adam Thoroughgood (1604–1640) of King's Lynn, Norfolk, England, the younger son of an influential family headed by the Reverend William Thorowgood, is one of the earliest Englishmen to become enamored with the area which became Virginia Beach. At the age of 18, he became an indentured servant to pay for passage to the Virginia Colony. Around 1622, he settled in an area south of the Chesapeake Bay a few miles inland from the Atlantic Ocean. This area had been passed by when the earlier settlements such as Jamestown were established beginning in 1607 in favor of locations further inland which would be less susceptible to attacks by other European forces, such as the Spanish.

Serving his period of indenture, he earned his freedom and became a leading citizen of the area. He was elected to the House of Burgesses for Elizabeth City (or "citiie" as it was then called) in 1629. He also served on the (Royal) Governor's Council, and as a Justice of the Court. He also became a Captain in the local militia.

The London Company lost its franchise and Virginia became a royal colony in 1624. In 1634, the Colony was divided into shires, soon renamed counties, a term still in use in Virginia 350 years later. Adam Thorowgood is credited using the name of his home in England when helping name New Norfolk County when it was formed from Elizabeth City County in 1637. The following year, New Norfolk County was split into Upper Norfolk County (soon renamed Nansemond County) and Lower Norfolk County, which was still quite large, encompassing the entire area now within the modern cities of Portsmouth, Norfolk, Chesapeake, and Virginia Beach. Thorowgood's 1635 patent covered 5,350 acres (21.7 km^{2}) of land. Much of the land between Lynnhaven River and Seawell's Point was owned by three men: Captain Thomas Willoughby, Francis Mason and Adam Thorowgood.

Thorowgood's residence after 1634 was along the Lynnhaven River, also named for his home in England. Thoroughgood appears to have had the foresight to realizing earlier than many other leaders that Lower Norfolk County was too large for a single site for convenient worship and court affairs. He led the effort to establish a second parish church, court, and glebe house at what was then known as Churches Point on the Lynnhaven River. Adam Thoroughgood suddenly became ill and died at the age of only 36 in 1640. He was buried at Churches Point in a location now believed to be submerged.

Today, some of the evidence of early English 17th-century settlement in the city survives, including the Adam Thoroughgood House museum and the Adam Keeling House, a private home also on the Lynnhaven River.

== 1638-1691 Lower Norfolk County grows, splits ==
Lower Norfolk County was quite large, and stretched all the way from the Atlantic Ocean west past the Elizabeth River and, as Thoroughgood had earlier envisioned, soon required two courthouses to service the citizenry. Finally, in 1691, Lower Norfolk County was in turn divided to form Norfolk County and Princess Anne County. Princess Anne, the easternmost county in South Hampton Roads, extended northward from the North Carolina border to Cape Henry at the mouth of the Chesapeake Bay, and included all of the area fronting the Atlantic Ocean. It was named after Anne, daughter of James II. Many of the settlers in Lower County of New Norfolk were cavaliers and religious refugees from the reigns of James I and James II; the latter's daughters were held in high regard by their father's subjects. Princess Anne County was to last from 1691 to 1963, over 250 years.

== Kempsville ==
Kempsville is a major historic section of Virginia Beach. Originally named Kempe's Landing and later Kemp's Landing, it was a colonial port of entry at the head of the Eastern Branch of the Elizabeth River.

=== Battle of Kemp's Landing ===
Originally named Kemp's Landing, in November 1775, Kempsville was the location where John Ackiss was killed by Royal Governor Lord Dunmore's militia during an incident later called the "Skirmish of Kempsville". Ackiss became the first Virginian casualty of the American Revolutionary War. The Daughters of the American Revolution later erected a plaque near the site.

== Historical landmarks ==
In 1720, Virginia's governor requested that a lighthouse be built on Cape Henry. It took a long time before the work was started. After being halted in 1774 by the outbreak of the Revolutionary War, the lighthouse was finally completed in 1791. In 1962 it was named Virginia Beach's official symbol.

Structures from the Virginia colony in Virginia Beach which are still extant as of 2007 include the Adam Thoroughgood House, Hermitage, Broad Bay Manor, Green Hill Plantation, Wolfsnare Plantation (also referred to as "Pallets"), John Biddle House, Pleasant Hall, Carraway House, Old Donation Episcopal Church, Adam Keeling House, Pembroke Manor, Upper Wolfsnare, Wishart House (Lynnhaven House) and Francis Land House.

== Incorporated town in 1906, independent city in 1952 ==
Beginning in the late 19th century, the small resort area of Virginia Beach grew in Princess Anne County, particularly after 1888 with the arrival of rail service and electricity. Developers built the original Princess Anne Hotel which opened in 1890 at the oceanfront near the tiny community of Seatack, named for a British "attack by sea" during the War of 1812. In 1891, guests at the new hotel watched the wreck and rescue efforts of the United States Life-Saving Service for the Norwegian bark Dictator. The ship's figurehead, which washed up on the beach several days later, was erected as a modest monument to the victims and rescue along the oceanfront for more than 50 years, and then became the inspiration for the current Norwegian Lady Monuments which were dedicated in 1962 in Virginia Beach, and Moss, Norway.

The "Gay Nineties" and the turn of the century saw a boom in construction of hotels and guest cottages to accommodate increasing numbers of summer vacationers flocking to the seashore. Over time, the grand old hotels and cottages succumbed to fire and the wrecking ball, to be replaced by the modern high-rise hotels and motels that line the shore today. Only one of the old Victorian cottages of that period still exists.

Although the resort was initially dependent upon railroad and electric trolley service, completion of the concrete Virginia Beach Boulevard extending from Norfolk in 1922 opened access for automobiles, buses, and trucks, and passenger rail service was eventually discontinued.

A railroad passenger station at Cape Henry built in 1902 and served by the original Norfolk Southern Railway was restored late in the 20th century and is used as an educational facility by Joint Expeditionary Base East. Another railroad station near 18th Street and Pacific Avenue was torn down. (Part of the original railroad from Norfolk near the Oceanfront is now used as a pedestrian and bicycle path).

The growing resort of Virginia Beach was incorporated as a town in 1906. B.P. Holland was chosen to be the Town's first mayor. He had been a clerk of the original Princess Anne Hotel many years earlier, and had witnessed the wreck of the Dictator. During the next 45 years, Virginia Beach continue to grow in popularity as a seasonal vacation spot, and casinos gave way to amusement parks and family-oriented attractions.

After the Second World War, Virginia Beach ushered in a new era fed by transportation improvements and a construction boom. The war also left the town with four permanent military installations, that continue to mark its landscape today: Joint Expeditionary Base East, Naval Air Station Oceana, Dam Neck Fleet Combat Training Center and the State Military Reservation (Camp Pendleton).

Virginia Beach became a tiny independent city in 1952. Under Virginia law, it became politically independent from Princess Anne County, although numerous ties remained between them. The change was seen as part of a larger reorganization of the boundaries and structures of almost all of the counties, cities and towns in southeastern Virginia which took place between 1952 and 1976.

In the mid 20th century, Princess Anne County lost a slice of territory in the northwest after successful annexation lawsuits by the City of Norfolk. Earlier, the city of Norfolk had annexed the entire northern portion of Norfolk County, and now directly bordered Princess Anne County. Leaders and residents of Princess Anne County came to see a reunion with the tiny independent city of Virginia Beach as a way to prevent Norfolk, whose population included a far greater number and proportion of African-Americans (about 43% as opposed to under 20% in Virginia Beach), from annexing more or potentially all of the county. In Virginia, cities are immune from annexation.

== 1963: Consolidation with Princess Anne County ==
In 1963, after approval by referendum of the voters of the City of Virginia Beach and Princess Anne County, and with the approval of the Virginia General Assembly, the two political subdivisions were consolidated as a new, much larger independent city, retaining the better-known name of the Virginia Beach resort. They needed to do this because of Virginia law states that a city and a county can not merge. They got past that by attaching the bill to the already large Virginia State budget. About the same time, at similar risk of annexations, Norfolk County took similar action, consolidating with the small independent City of South Norfolk to form the City of Chesapeake, which became Virginia Beach's new neighbor to the southwest.

Today, most of the area formerly in Princess Anne County when it was formed in 1691 is now located within the City of Virginia Beach. The only exceptions are some territory of the northwestern portion which became part of the City of Norfolk through annexation and a land swap agreement between the two cities in 1988.

== 1989: "Greekfest" riots ==
An increasing number of African American college students converged on the Virginia Beach resort area for the Labor Day Weekend each year in the late 1980s. During the Labor Day weekend of 1989, rioting and looting broke out. Greekfest attendees destroyed property within the hotels and threw televisions, furniture, and other items over hotel balconies. Approximately 100 stores and restaurants stretching over two dozen blocks on the ocean front had been damaged and/or had merchandise stolen. A police horse was killed when it was struck in the head by an item thrown over a balcony. Apparently fearing for their safety, Virginia Beach police abandoned the oceanfront, returning hours later in full riot gear. The Virginia National Guard arrived around dawn and a state of emergency was declared by order of the Governor of Virginia. A nighttime curfew of 8 pm was placed in effect and hundreds of Greekfest attendees caught out in the streets after curfew were arrested by law enforcement authorities over the next two nights.The police blotter listed more than 650 people arrested over the weekend.

== The King Neptune Statue ==
The King Neptune statue was built in honor of the Neptune Festival, which is a local festival held each September.

== 2019: Something in the Water music festival ==
Virginia Beach native Pharrell Williams organized an oceanfront festival called Something in the Water. The event was, in part, a response to negativity surrounding the annual arrival of college students for spring break previously known as "Greekfest". The event featured other popular music performers from the area including Missy Elliott and Timbaland. Appearances were made by Jay-Z and Snoop Dogg. Other activities included sports demonstrations, arts and technology experiences, professional networking, and an open-air church. Complications in 2025 led to the City of Virginia beach cancelling the festival after failing to meet requirements. The festival in recent years has struggled to keep opening after COVID as well as poor weather hurting attendance rates, however, it is still set to occur in 2026.

== 2019 Virginia Beach Shooting ==
On May 31, 2019, a mass shooting occurred at a municipal building in the Princess Anne area of Virginia Beach, Virginia. The gunman, DeWayne Craddock, who was a disgruntled city employee, fatally shot 12 people and wounded four others. He was then shot dead by responding police officers.

== See also ==
- Timeline of Virginia Beach, Virginia
- List of mayors of Virginia Beach, Virginia
