= Timeline of Virginia Beach, Virginia =

The following is a timeline of the history of the city of Virginia Beach, Virginia, USA.

== Prior to 20th century ==
- 1607 - English colonists land on beach.
- 1639 - Lynnhaven Parish Church built.
- 1720 - Adam Thoroughgood House built (approximate date).
- 1736 - Old Donation Episcopal Church built.
- 1750 - Kempsville district established as Kemps Landing (approximate date).
- 1775 - Battle of Kemp's Landing
- 1781 - September 5: Battle of the Chesapeake.
- 1791 - Nimmo Church constructed. It is the oldest church with the original foundation in the area. Bishop Francis Asbury preached there.[10]
- 1810 - Francis Land House built (approximate date).
- 1879 - Cape Henry Lighthouse built.
- 1888 - Oceanfront Boardwalk built.
- 1891 - Norwegian ship Dictator wrecked offshore.
- 1900 - Population: 11,192.

== 20th century ==
- 1906 - Town of Virginia Beach incorporated.
- 1933 - Bayne Theatre opens (approximate date).
- 1935 - Cape Henry Memorial erected.
- 1941 - The Virginia Beach and Princess Anne Chapters of the NAACP were formed.
- 1952 - City of Virginia Beach incorporated.
- 1953 - August: Hurricane Barbara.
- 1960 - Population: 84,215.
- 1963 - City merges with Princess Anne County.
- 1964 - Chesapeake Bay Bridge–Tunnel opens.
- 1970 - Population: 172,106.
- 1980 - Population: 262,199.
- 1988 - Meyera E. Oberndorf becomes mayor.
- 1989 - Virginia Museum of Contemporary Art opens.
- 1990 - Population: 393,069.
- 2000 - City website online (approximate date).

== 21st century ==
- 2009 - Will Sessoms becomes mayor.
- 2010 - Population: 437,994 in city; 1,676,822 in Virginia Beach-Norfolk-Newport News, VA-NC Metropolitan Statistical Area.
- 2019 - The Virginia Beach shooting occurs.
- 2023 - An EF3 tornado rips through the northern edge of the city, damaging or destroying several homes. There was no fatalities and no injuries.

== See also ==
- History of Virginia Beach, Virginia
- List of mayors of Virginia Beach, Virginia
- National Register of Historic Places listings in Virginia Beach, Virginia
- History of Hampton Roads area
- Timelines of other cities in Virginia: Alexandria, Hampton, Lynchburg, Newport News, Norfolk, Portsmouth, Richmond, Roanoke

== Bibliography ==
- Federal Writers' Project (1941), "Virginia Beach", Virginia: a Guide to the Old Dominion, American Guide Series, Oxford University Press, pp. 481–482, OL 24223083M
- Ory Mazar Nergal, ed. (1980), "Virginia Beach, VA", Encyclopedia of American Cities, New York: E.P. Dutton, p. 350+, OL 4120668M
- Nicholas J. Swartz (2010). "Does consolidation make a difference?: a comparative analysis of Richmond and Virginia Beach, Virginia". In Suzanne M. Leland; Kurt Thurmaier (eds.). City-County Consolidation: Promises Made, Promises Kept?. Georgetown University Press. ISBN 978-1-58901-622-4.
