= Henry Town =

Henry Town, Henry Towne, or Henries Towne was an early English colonial settlement near Cape Henry, the southern point and gateway to the Chesapeake Bay in the Colony and Dominion of Virginia, now in modern Virginia Beach, Virginia, on the East Coast of the United States. Archaeologist Floyd Painter of the Norfolk Museum of Arts and Sciences (now the Chrysler Museum of Art) originally excavated the site in 1955, but it was only conclusively determined to be Henry Town in 2007 by United States Army scientists reviewing the site's artifacts, and no primary source documents exist (save those supposedly held by one now-deceased archaeologist). It was located east of Norfolk, Virginia and north of Chesapeake and south of the Hampton Roads harbor at approximately 36°54′30″N 76°7′20″W. The historical and archeological site is immediately north of U.S. Route 60 (Shore Drive) on what is now Lake Joyce, formerly an inlet connecting with Pleasure House Creek, a western branch of the Lynnhaven River, itself an estuary of the Chesapeake Bay and Hampton Roads.

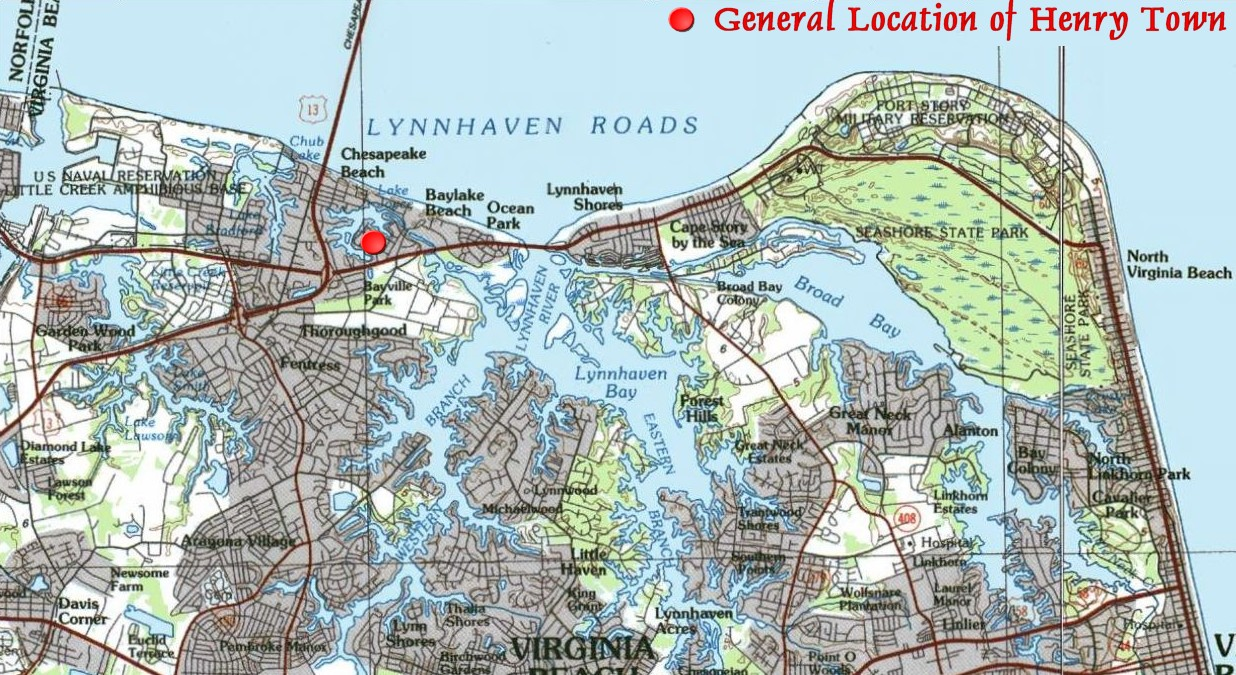
The general location of Henry Town

== Historical and archaeological record ==
Henry Town was first described by name in a 1613 letter by the Colony of Virginia's lieutenant governor, Samuel Argall, who wrote of sending a fishing ship "to Henries Towne for the reliefe of such men as were there." Other extant documents mention several forts at the mouth of the Chesapeake Bay as early as 1610, possibly including Henry Town. These records indicate that settlement at Henry Town was contemporary with that at Virginia's first permanent settlement at Jamestown which was founded in 1607 on the opposite Western Shore of the Bay on the north shore upstream of the James River. Captain John Smith of Jamestown wrote of returning to Cape Henry in 1608 after his crew and a small boat outfitted with a sail had completed their first of several explorations of the coast and length of the Chesapeake Bay, but did not mention why or exactly where.

Despite this documentary evidence, most of the archaeological finds at the Henry Town site date from the middle rather than the early 17th century. Although an archaeologist from the National Park Service of the United States Department of the Interior who oversaw excavations on Jamestown Island and other archaeologists from the Smithsonian Institution in Washington, D.C. and the College of William and Mary in Williamsburg, Virginia have earlier dated the finds as early as 1610, others such as the head of the James River Institute for Archaeology and part of the academic team that discovered the original site and remains of the historic Jamestown, the curator of the Jamestown Rediscovery collection, and other regional experts dispute such an early date. A limited 2005 excavation at the site dated nothing earlier than the second quarter of the 17th century. The site's artifacts also contained Dutch and Portuguese pottery fragments that point to later settlement and tobacco pipe pieces that are nearly the same as some from the neighboring colonial Province of Maryland that have been reliably dated to about 1650. Some discoveries suggest that the site is connected to Adam Thoroughgood's nearby tobacco plantation, which dates to about 1635.

== Contemporary discovery and development ==
Before its identification as Henry Town the site had been called the Lake Joyce site or the Chesopean site. Its discovery in 1955 attracted attention but it was not until a reexamination of the evidence in light of the Samuel Argall letter that the site was identified by an archaeological team based in the Fort Eustis army base in Newport News.

The relevance of the settlement to the early history of the English colony in Virginia has given impetus for the recreation of the site. At nearby Cape Henry, east of the Lynnhaven River, the First Landing Foundation will undertake a $700,000 project to build more than a dozen structures as well as an outdoor stage to conduct historical dramas.

== See also ==
- History of Virginia
- Jamestown, Virginia
- Former counties, cities, and towns of Virginia
