= 5th Transportation Command (Terminal) =

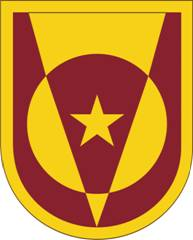
- Active: April 6, 1966 - June 5, 1971
- Country: United States
- Branch: Army
- Decorations: US Army Meritorious Unit Commendation — 30 April - 31 October 1968; Republic of Vietnam Gallantry Cross w/Palm — 1 March - 9 October 1971

The 5th Transportation Command (Terminal) was a short lived unit during the Vietnam War. The command was activated at Fort Story, Virginia in 1966. The command arrived in Vietnam in August 1966 to take over port operations in Qui Nhon from the 4th Transportation Command. The unit unloaded and loaded both large ocean going vessels as well as upriver traffic from the port. The command moved from Qui Nhon to Da Nang in June 1970 to take over port operations there during the drawdown of forces due to the Vietnamization policy. The unit would continue in Da Nang until June 5, 1972.

Shoulder Sleeve Insignia is a square shield with a rounded bottom 2 inches by 2 1/2 inches with a gold border. The center is filled in brick red with a gold circle bisected by a gold and red "V". Finally there is a gold star in the center. The shoulder sleeve insignia was approved on 6 April 1967.

The unit was never issued a distinctive unit insignia, which were generally only given to brigades and regiments until after the Vietnam War ended.

The unit was awarded a Meritorious Unit Commendation and the Republic of Vietnam Gallantry Cross with Palm.
