= 16-inch howitzer M1920 =

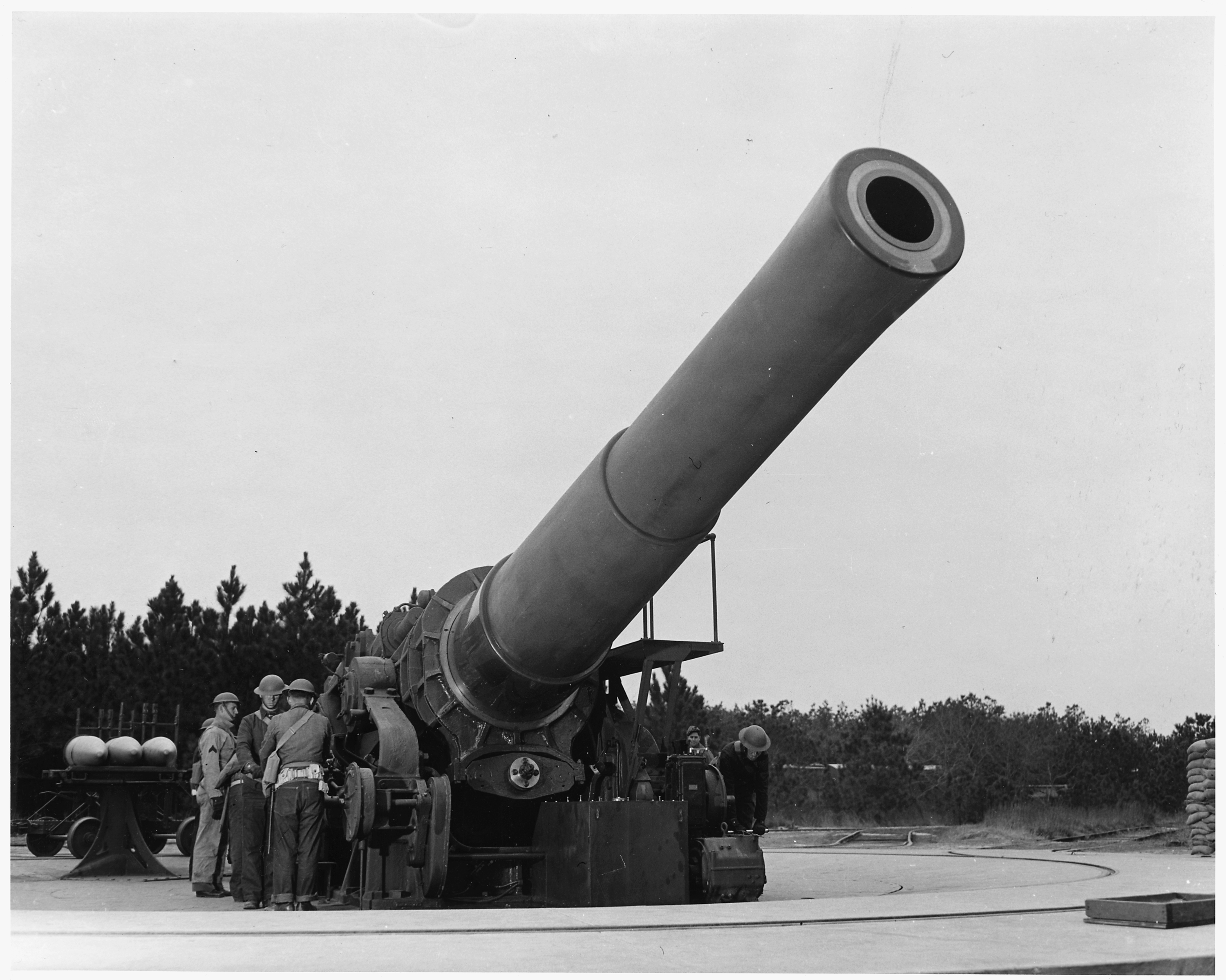
- 16-inch howitzer M1920 at Fort Story, Virginia
- Type: Coastal artillery
- Place of origin: United States

Service history
- In service: 1922–1947
- Used by: United States Army
- Wars: World War II

Production history
- Designer: Watervliet Arsenal
- Designed: 1918
- Manufacturer: Watervliet Arsenal
- Produced: 1920
- No. built: Probably 5 (prototype plus 4 operational); 4 carriages

Specifications
- Barrel length: 25 calibers, 400 inches (10 m) bore length
- Shell: bagged charge, separate loading, 2,100 lb (950 kg) AP shell
- Caliber: 16 inch (406 mm)
- Breech: Interrupted screw, Welin type
- Recoil: hydropneumatic
- Carriage: barbette M1920
- Elevation: -7° to +65°
- Traverse: 360°
- Maximum firing range: 24,500 yards (22,400 m)
- Feed system: manual

The 16-inch howitzer M1920 (406 mm) was a coastal artillery piece installed to defend major American seaports between 1922 and 1947. They were operated by the United States Army Coast Artillery Corps. They were installed on high-angle barbette mountings to allow plunging fire. Only four of these weapons were deployed, all at Fort Story, Virginia. All were scrapped within a few years after World War II.

== History ==
Around the outbreak of World War I in 1914 it was noted that the rapid development of dreadnought battleships might soon render US coast defenses obsolescent. These had been constructed 1895-1915 under the Endicott and Taft programs. The United States Army's initial response was to place some existing 12-inch guns on high-angle long-range mountings. This program had barely commenced when the American entry into World War I occurred in April 1917. The Coast Artillery Corps was tasked with operating almost all US-manned heavy and railway artillery in that war, as they were the only component of the Army experienced with large guns and having significant troop strength. Among several types of French-made railway artillery weapons operated by the Coast Artillery were two 400 mm (15.75 inch) Modele 1916 howitzers. This weapon combined a large shell with a high trajectory, dropping almost straight down onto enemy trenches and fortifications. The Coast Artillery wanted to use this capability for plunging fire against the thin deck armor of enemy ships. Initially a single developmental 16-inch howitzer M1918, 18 calibers long, was produced and mounted on a railway carriage. Testing with this showed that a somewhat longer weapon, allowing greater range, would be suitable for coastal defense. This originated the 16-inch M1920 howitzer, 25 calibers long. The high-angle M1920 barbette carriage was designed to allow plunging fire with an elevation of 65 degrees. A similar carriage was also developed for the 16-inch gun M1919, 50 calibers long, with the same elevation and for the same reason.

The combined effects of the Armistice of 11 November 1918 and the signature of the Treaty of Versailles in June 1919, ending the "War to End All Wars", cut military budgets heavily. Although the new 16-inch weapons were produced and deployed, this occurred in very limited quantities. Only seven M1919 guns and four M1920 howitzers were deployed by 1923. All four of the M1920 howitzers were deployed at Fort Story, Virginia, in the Harbor Defenses of Chesapeake Bay. The narrow entrance to the bay could be adequately covered by the short-ranged howitzers. They were initially in one battery, Battery Pennington, named for Colonel Alexander Cummings McWhorter Pennington Jr., who served in the Civil War and the Spanish–American War. Their mountings were open, making them vulnerable to air attack, a possibility the Army did little to allow for until the late 1930s. A rail system supplied the guns with ammunition from magazines to the rear of the guns. A plotting room bunker was also behind the guns.

In 1940 emplacements 3 and 4 were renamed Battery Walke, after Brigadier General Willoughby Walke. In 1941 shields were provided for each gun to give the crews some protection, but the guns were never casemated, unlike most Army 16-inch gun installations. After World War II ended it was soon determined that gun defenses were obsolete, and the battery was inactivated in 1947, with all guns and carriages scrapped soon after.

== Gallery ==
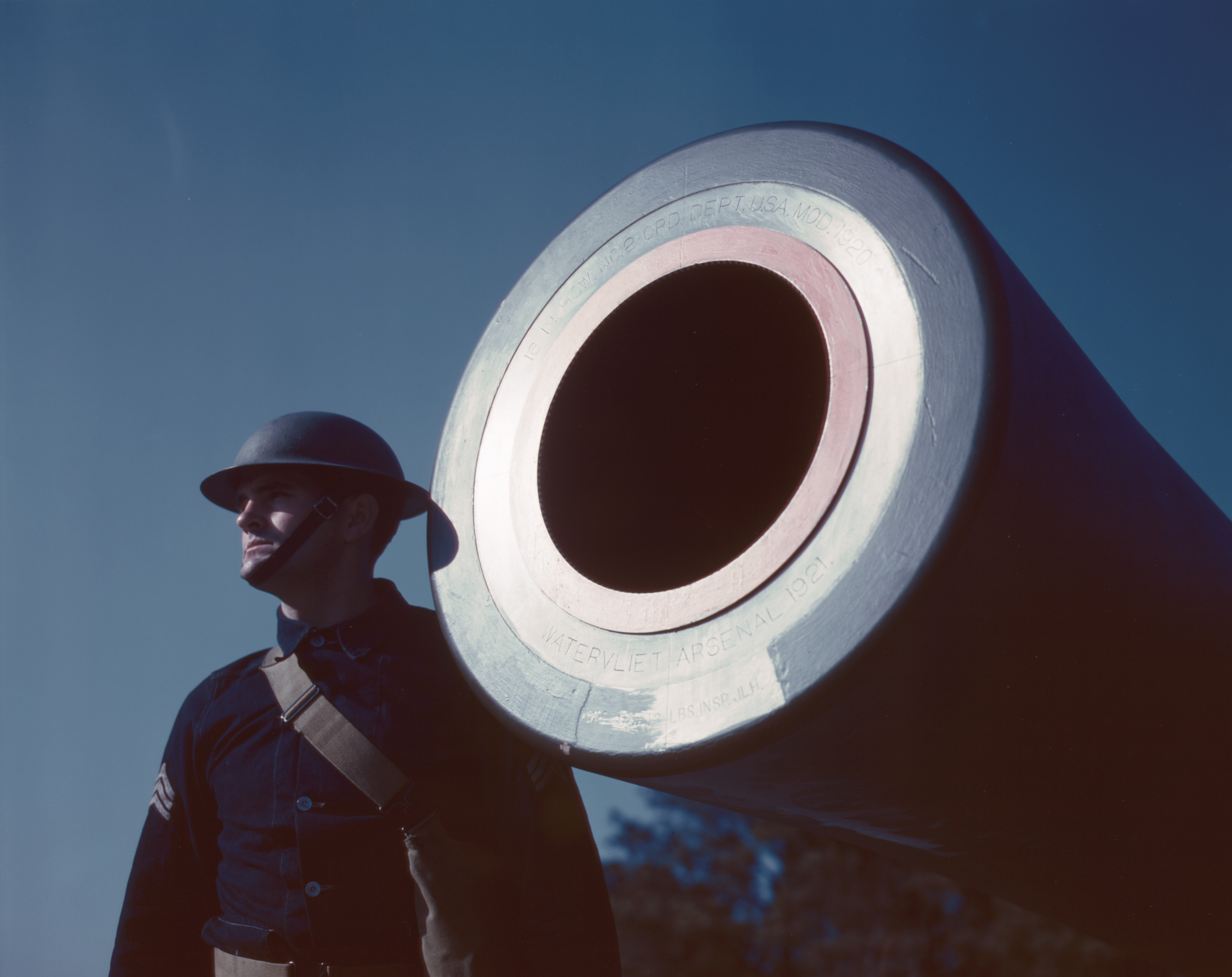
Soldier with 16-inch howitzer in 1942; the muzzle markings can be read.

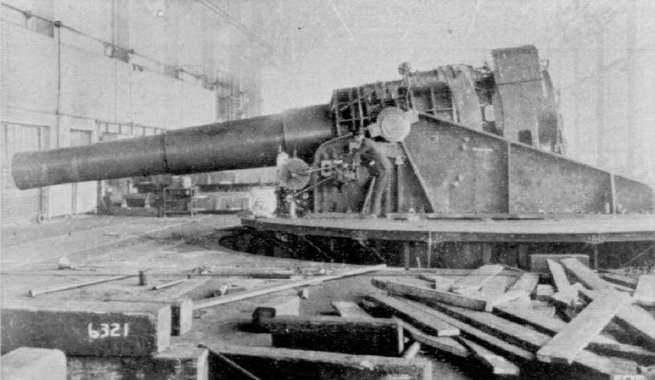
16-inch howitzer in the final stages of mounting

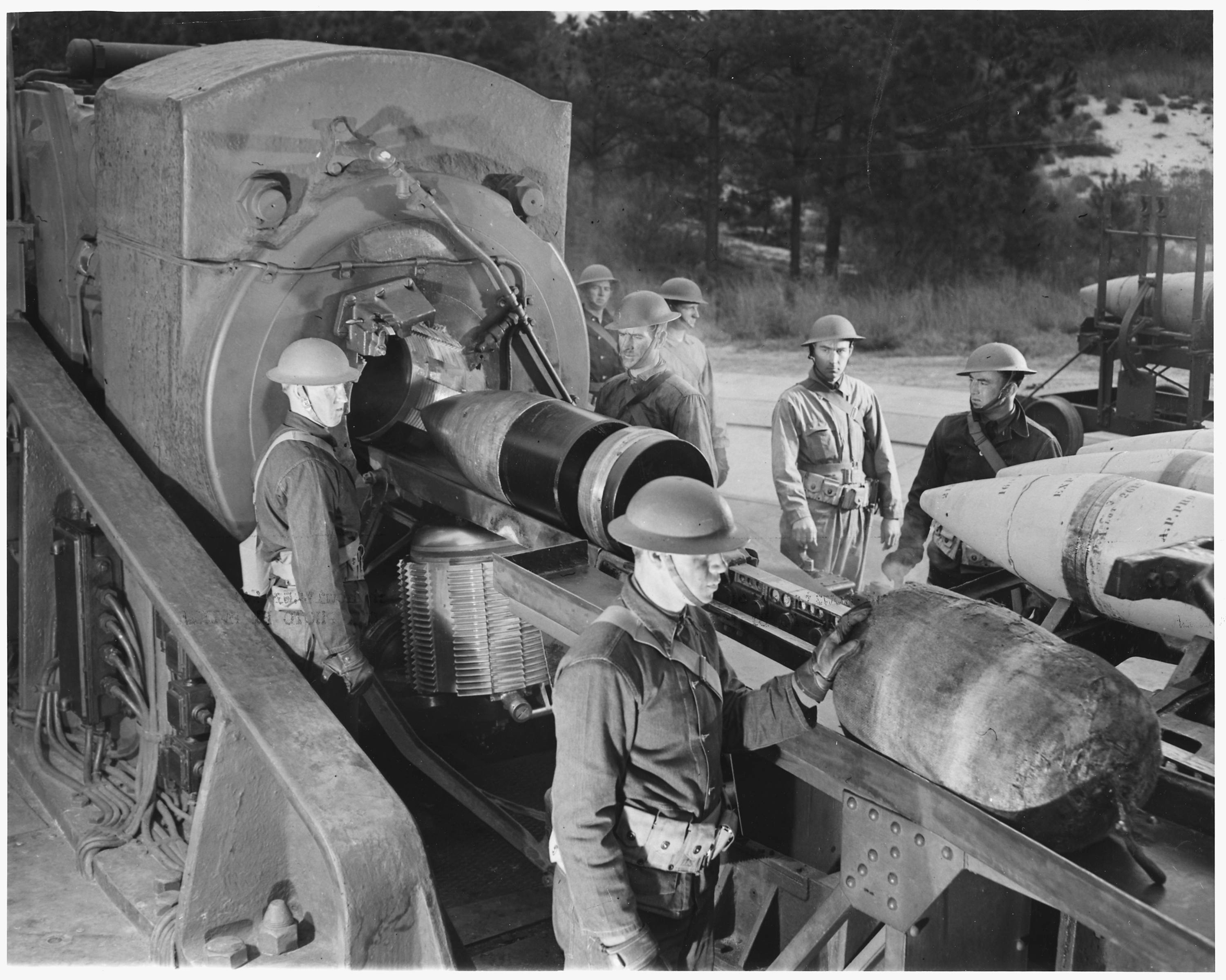
Practice loading of a 16-inch howitzer

== See also ==
- Coastal artillery
- Seacoast defense in the United States
- United States Army Coast Artillery Corps
- 16-inch gun M1919
- 16"/50 caliber Mark 2 gun
- Coast Artillery fire control system
