= Brock Environmental Center =

The Brock Environmental Center
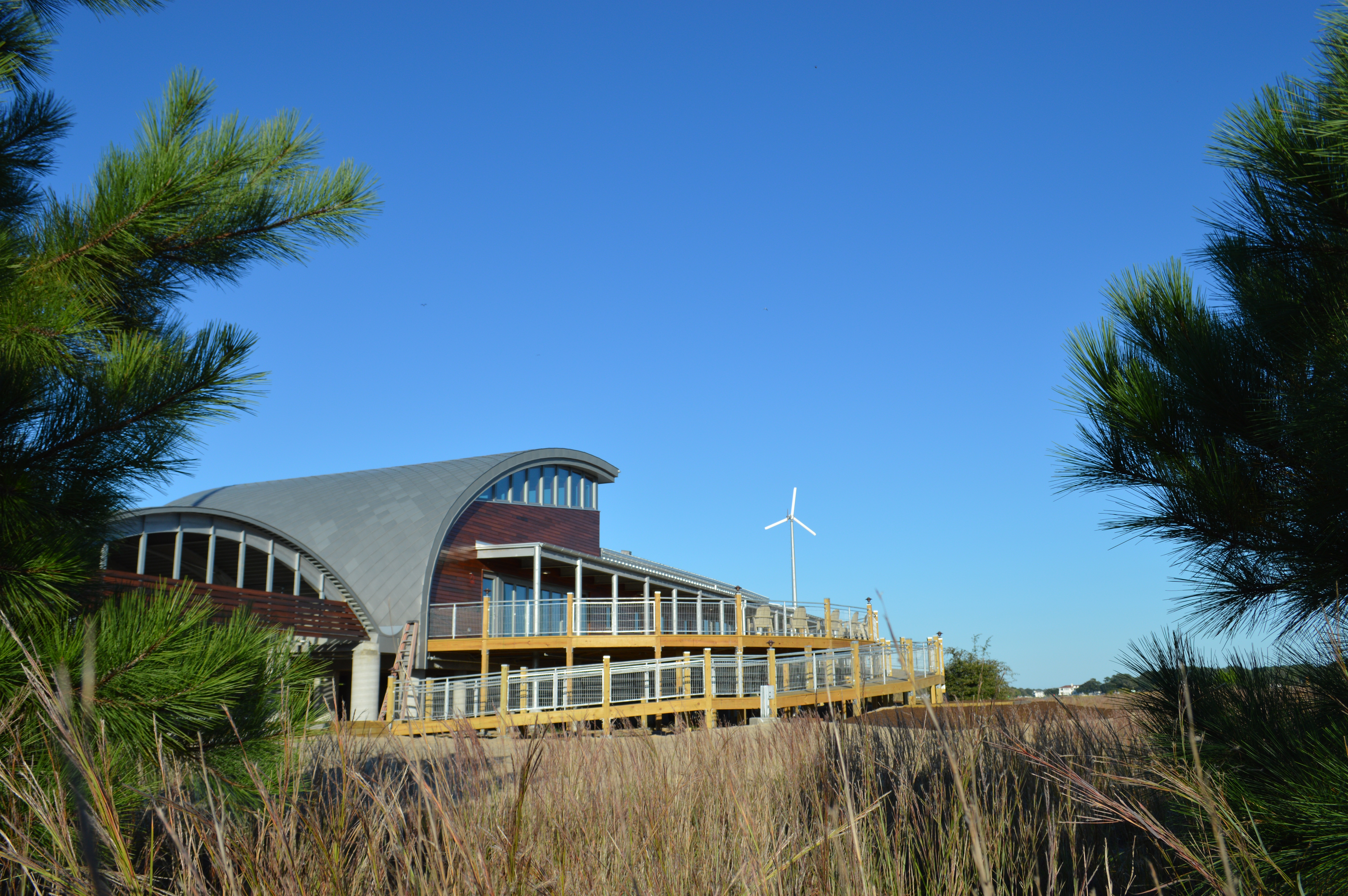

- Location within Virginia

General information
- Type: Environmental center and office space
- Location: Virginia Beach, Virginia, United States
- Coordinates: 36.9039°N 76.0979°W
- Construction started: 2012
- Completed: 2014
- Cost: US$21 million
- Owner: The Chesapeake Bay Foundation

Technical details
- Floor count: 1
- Floor area: 10,000 sq ft (930 m^{2})

Design and construction
- Architect: SmithGroupJJR
- Main contractor: Hourigan Construction

The Chesapeake Bay Foundation's (CBF) Brock Environmental Center is located on the banks of the Lynnhaven River in Virginia Beach, Virginia. It is designed to meet the highest environmental standards in accordance with The U.S. Green Building Council's Leadership in Energy and Environmental Design and the Living Building Challenge. Home to CBF's Hampton Roads staff and local conservation group, Lynnhaven River NOW, the Brock Center will benefit the larger public with spaces indoors and out for community and student groups.

== Background ==
=== Pleasure House Point ===
Pleasure House Point is a 118-acre peninsula on the Lynnhaven River in Virginia Beach at the mouth of the Chesapeake Bay. Developers purchased the land and planned to build "Indigo Dunes," a development of more than 1,100 new high-rise condos and townhouses. When the housing market collapsed in 2008, the building plans came to a halt, and the bank foreclosed on the property.

In 2012, The Chesapeake Bay Foundation partnered with the City of Virginia Beach, the Trust for Public Land, and the local community to buy Pleasure House Point for $13 million, preserving it for recreation and education.

The Chesapeake Bay Foundation bought a small corner of the property to build the Brock Environmental Center. The building takes its name from Virginia Beach philanthropist Dollar Tree founder Macon Brock and his wife Joan.

=== Living Building Challenge ===
The Living Building Challenge is the highest standard of certification for energy efficient, environmentally smart design and construction. The Challenge is composed of seven performance categories called Petals: Place, Water, Energy, Health and Happiness, Materials, Equity, and Beauty.

The Chesapeake Bay Foundation expects that the center will be LEED-Platinum certified and that it will meet the Living Building Challenge certification. This rare designation means the building has a net-zero impact on the environment even after a full year of operation.

== Design and construction ==
=== Energy independence ===
Rooftop photo-voltaic panels produce approximately 60 percent of the Brock Environmental Center’s energy needs. Two residential-scale 10-kilowatt wind turbines provide the additional 40 percent of energy. Geothermal wells are used to take advantage of the earth's constant 54-degree temperature by exchanging heat with a recirculated fluid that is sent down a closed loop located 300 feet below the surface after which the fluid sent back up to the surface to warm the building air in the winter and cool the building air in the summer before sent down the earth again. The treated air is circulate through the building with a high-efficiency HVAC.

As a result of other energy efficient and conservation design elements, the building uses 80% less energy than a typical building its size.

The building is positioned to receive maximum southern exposure for warmth and to receive natural ventilation from the prevailing winds. Exterior walls, floors, and roof insulation are designed to reduce energy demands by maximizing the building’s insulation.

=== Water independence ===
Two 1,600-gallon (6,056-liter) rain cisterns and a filtering system make the Brock Environmental Center the first project in the United States to receive a commercial permit for drinking filtered rainwater. The commercial permit was given in accordance with the federal drinking water requirements.

The toilets are composting waterless units that turn human waste into usable organic material. Rain gardens will capture and filter extra runoff, and a special graywater garden will cleanse graywater (wastewater generated from sinks and showers).

=== Materials ===
To meet the Living Building Challenge, designers did not use any “Red List” materials that include chemicals and materials considered harmful to humans and the environment. Materials and chemicals listed on the Living Building Challenge’s Red List include polyvinyl chloride (PVC) and halogenated flame retardants, among others.

The builders also worked with the community to use reclaimed and salvaged materials such as sinks, doors, mirrors, counters, cabinets, floor boards, used bike racks, student art tables, and old wood paneling. Supplies came from sources throughout the community including old office buildings, school houses, and a local parks department.

== Use of building ==
=== Education center ===
The Brock Environmental Center is home base for the Chesapeake Bay Foundation’s outdoor field education program serving Hampton Roads students and teachers. According to CBF "Our courses combine many academic disciplines – earth science, biology, history, art, English/writing, math, chemistry, civics, economics, government, and responsible citizenship. As a result, students become exceptionally informed and inspired, valuing the bay and its watershed as a living, connected system." Pleasure House Point is an active demonstration site for important and relevant restoration projects, including oyster, wetland, and other habitat restoration, as well as water quality improvement initiatives. By engaging in outdoor educational experiences in natural areas and on waterways, program participants can better understand the Chesapeake Bay.

=== Community resource ===
The Brock Center contains a large conference room and smaller meeting spaces available for community meetings, discussions, and collaboration.
