= Edward Windham =

Colonist and leader in Virginia (1608–1664)

Edward Windham (1608–1664) was a member of the Virginia General Assembly from 1642 to 1643. He was also appointed to the council to govern Maryland in 1652.

Windham migrated to colonial Virginia from Norfolk, England in 1634 when he was 26. He represented Lower Norfolk County, Virginia in 1642-1643 in the Virginia General Assembly. Windham also served as a judge and military advisor, and as a commissioner for keeping monthly courts in Lower Norfolk. In 1639, he was appointed inspector of tobacco crops in Portsmouth, Virginia. He was one of the eight members of the council of war that met in 1645. In 1651, he joined the Puritan emigration to Maryland. The following year, he was appointed to the council to govern Maryland. Windham later returned to England where he died in 1664.

== Biography ==
Edward Windham was born in 1608 in Norfolk, England, into a prominent family.

Windham migrated to America on the ship, the John and Dorothy in 1634 with Capt. Adam Thoroughgood, when he was 26. The tideland nature of the coast of Norfolk, England resembles that of Lower Norfolk County, Virginia.

He married Abigail Offley, the daughter of Robert Offley, who was an adventurer of the Virginia Company of London. His wife's sister was married to Thoroughgood; she also later married Francis Yeardley, the son of the Governor of Virginia George Yeardley.

== Political career ==
=== Virginia ===
When Windham migrated to colonial Virginia, major events in England had a major impact on life in Virginia,. The colony had strategic significance for European powers, and there were conflicts between colonists and indigenous people. In Lower Norfolk County, there were engagements with the Nanticoke tribes.

Court records of July 17, 1639, state that "it was ordered that 15 men out of Lower Norfolk County be appointed to march against the Menticoke Indians." Adam Thoroughgood and Edward Windham were among the members of the court in Lynnehaven.

Windham represented Lower Norfolk County, Virginia in the 1642-1643 Virginia General Assembly. He was a member of the Virginia House of Burgesses, which convened at Jamestown on March 1. He was the first burgess elected from Lower Norfolk County, and he served in that capacity with Cornelius Lloyd and the other member from his county. He was present at the Assembly held on April 1, 1642. He protested, as a burgess, against the dissolution of the proprietary government.

Windham also served as a judge and military advisor in the Tidewater Region of Virginia. On June 16, 1637, the Governor of Virginia, William Berkeley, appointed Wyndham as one of the commissioners for keeping monthly courts in Lower Norfolk. On January 6, 1639, he was appointed inspector of tobacco crops for the county Clerk's Office, in Portsmouth, Virginia. He was one of the eight members of the council of war that met on June 3, 1645 during the Anglo-Powhatan Wars.

In 1651, Windham was still a resident of Lower Norfolk County but is said to have joined the Puritan emigration to Maryland.

=== Maryland ===
In March 1652, he was appointed as one of the six members of the council to govern Maryland during the argument between the party of Oliver Cromwell and George Calvert, 1st Lord Baltimore. This council was named to administer the oath of allegiance to the English Commonwealth from the province of Maryland, as evidenced by the written Proclamation of the council on March 29, 1652.

Windham and Richard Burke were replaced as council members in 1653 by Captain John Price and Thomas Hatton, who is described as a "loyal friend of Lord Baltimore."

In the same year, Windham's brother-in-law, Francis Yeardley, became a member of the House of Burgesses.

== Death ==
Windham returned to England. He died in 1664 and was buried in Stokesley, Norfolk.
