= Chesapeake people =

Extinct Native American tribe from Virginia

Chesepian
K'che-sepi-ack
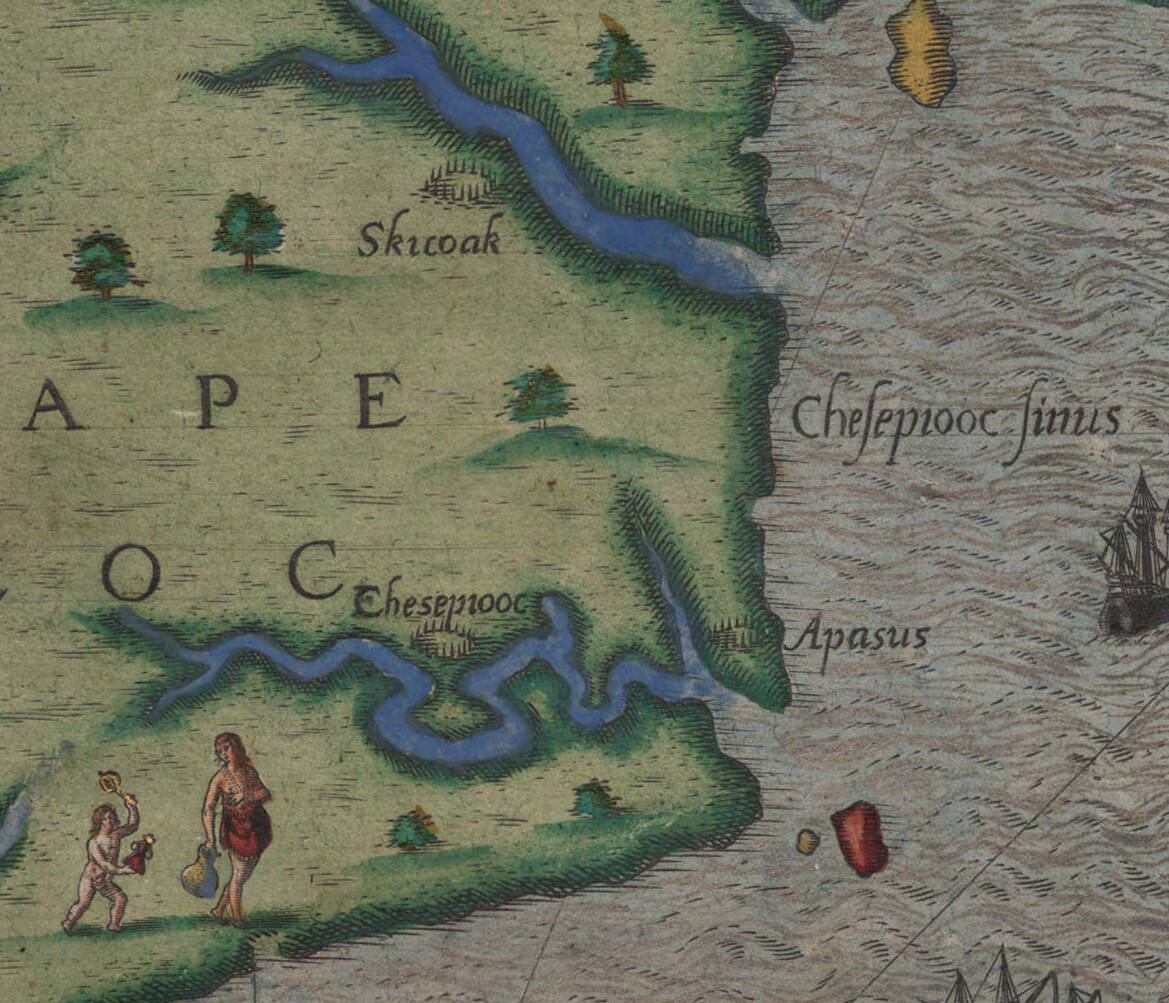
- Map of Virginia with Chesapeake native villages, circa 1585

Total population
- Extinct as a tribe

Regions with significant populations
- Virginia, South Hampton Roads

Languages
- Algonquian languages

Religion
- Native American religion

Related ethnic groups
- Nansemond

The Chesepian (Chesapeake) were a Native American tribe who lived near present-day South Hampton Roads in the U.S. state of Virginia. They occupied an area which is now in the independent cities of Norfolk and Virginia Beach (formerly Norfolk County and Princess Anne County).

== Name ==
The name Chesapeake is an anglicisation of the Algonquian word, K'che-sepi-ack, which translates as "country on a great river." The name for the Native American tribe is spelled many different ways, "Chesapian" is commonly used. In 1585, Ralph Lane used both "Chesapians" and "Chesapeaks",. John Smith's charts and writings also show variety but most frequently used "Chesapeaks". John White's illustrations used "Ehesepiooc".

== Settlements ==
They occupied an area which is now the Norfolk, Portsmouth, Chesapeake and Virginia Beach areas. The main village of the Chesepian was Skicoak on the peninsula east of the Elizabeth River either on that river or near the Lynnhaven River.

Two other Chesepian towns were Apasus and Chesepioc (Chesepiuc), both on the same peninsula in what is now the city of Virginia Beach. Chesepioc lay on Great Neck Point east of the Lynnhaven River. Archaeologists and others have found numerous Native American arrowheads, stone axes, pottery, and beads in Great Neck Point. Several native burials were found as well.

== Language and affiliation ==
Although they spoke an Eastern Algonquian language like many tribes within the Powhatan Confederacy, archaeological evidence suggests that the Chesepian people originally belonged to another group, the Carolina Algonquian.

== History ==
The culture of the Chesapians is called "Late Woodland" and they depended heavily on the resources of the Chesapeake Bay, notably the fish and shellfish.

There is evidence that some of the survivors of the Roanoke Colony settled with the Chesapians after the failure of their settlement.

In 1607, after the decimation by Powhatan, the Chesapians had about 100 warriors and a total population estimated at 350. By 1669, they ceased to exist as a tribe.

=== Demise ===
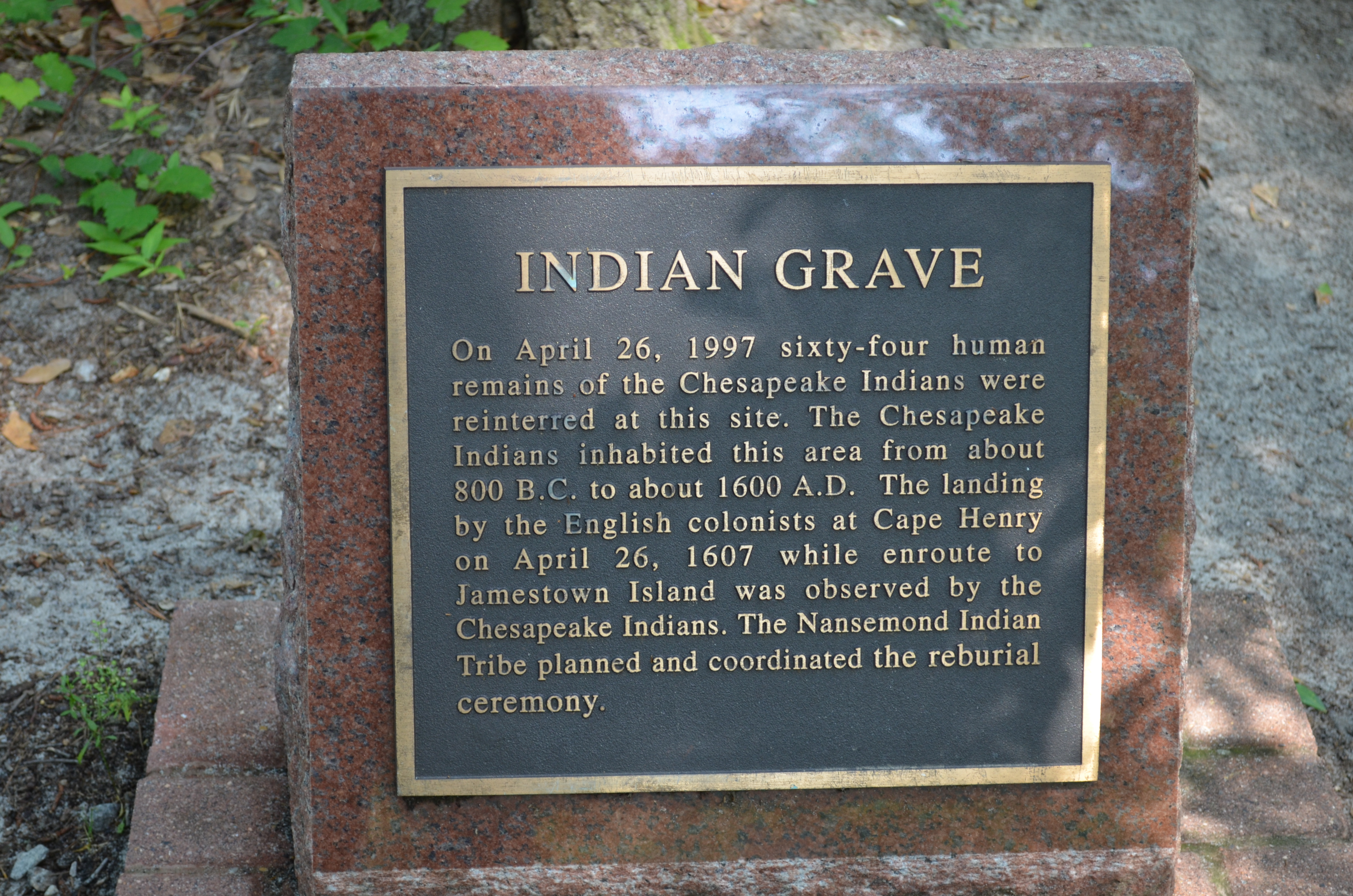
Grave marker of relocated remains of Chesapeake natives

According to William Strachey's The Historie of Travaile Into Virginia Britannia (1618), the Chesepian were wiped out by the Powhatan, the leader of the Tsenacommacah–based Powhatan Confederacy, sometime before the arrival of the English at Jamestown in 1607. The Chesepian were eliminated because Powhatan's priests had warned him that "from the Chesapeake Bay a nation should arise, which should dissolve and give end to his empire".

Though historians of the period express little doubt that the Powhatans eradicated the Chesapeake tribe, Strachey's belief that these rumored prophesies indicated the Christian God's intervention on behalf of the Jamestown Colony against "The Devil's Empire" appears, in hindsight, rather eccentric.

== Sources ==
- Helen C. Rountree. The Powhatan Indians of Virginia: Their Traditional Culture. Norman, Univ. of Oklahoma Press (1989).
- Helen C. Rountree. Pocahontas's People: The Powhatan Indians of Virginia through Four Centuries. Norman, Univ. of Oklahoma Press (1990).
- Shi, David, E. America: A Narrative History (6th edition), (2004) W.W. Norton & Company, Inc.
- Strachey, William (1849) [composed c. 1612]. The Historie of Travaile into Virginia Britannia. London: Hakluyt Society.
