= Old Donation Episcopal Church =

Church building in Virginia, US

- Old Donation Church
- U.S. National Register of Historic Places
- Virginia Landmarks Register
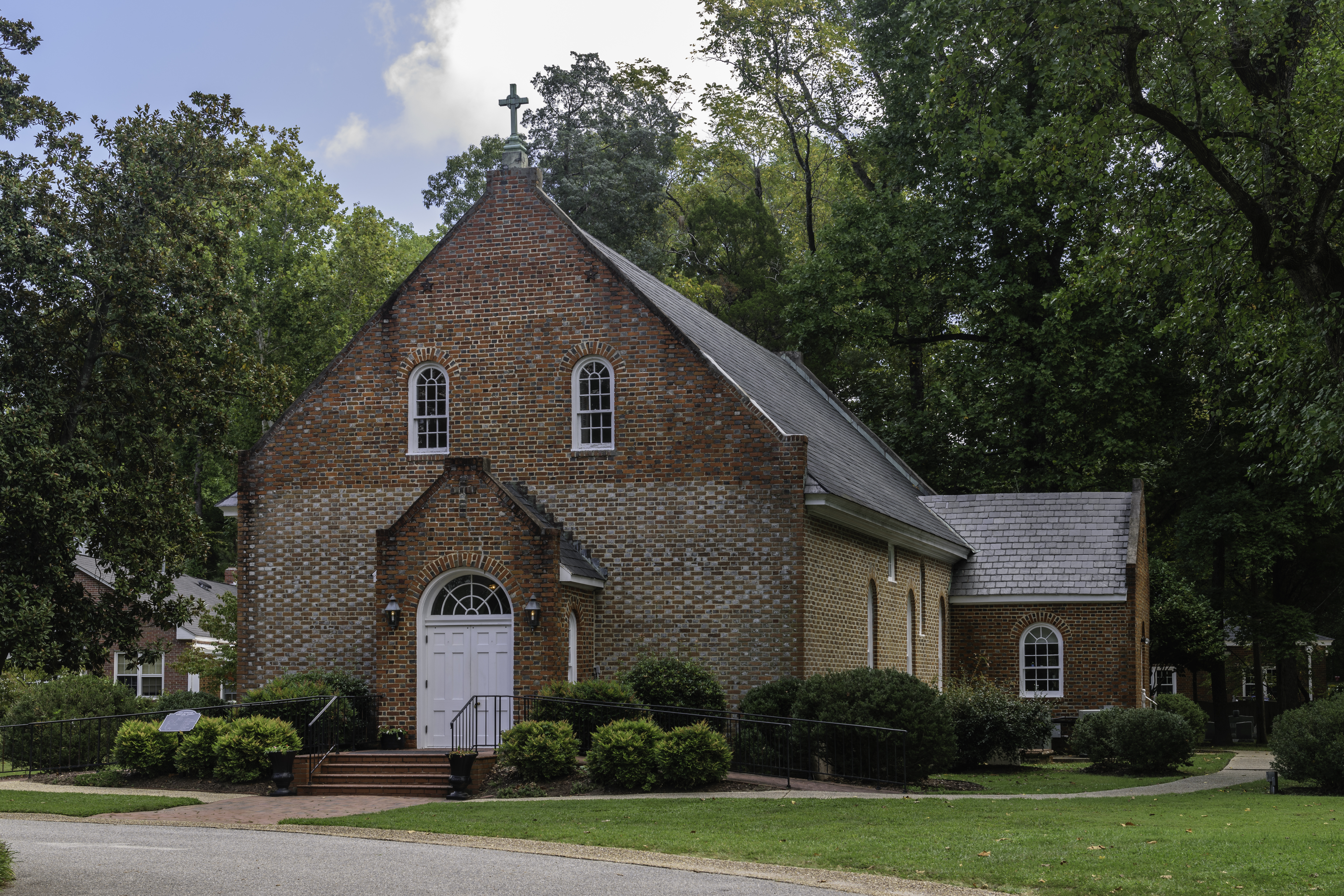
- Old Donation Episcopal Church

- Location within Virginia Location within the United States
- Location: 4449 N. Witch Duck Rd., Virginia Beach, Virginia
- Coordinates: 36°52′0″N 76°7′45″W
- Area: 8 acres (3.2 ha)
- Built: 1736
- NRHP reference No.: 72001534
- VLR No.: 134-0025

Significant dates
- Added to NRHP: April 13, 1972
- Designated VLR: November 16, 1971

Old Donation Church is the third Lynnhaven Parish Church and is the oldest church in Virginia Beach, Virginia, United States. Records show that the parish's first church services were held in 1637 in the home of Adam Thoroughgood. The first church building was constructed on Mr. Thoroughgood's land in 1639 on the location later known as "Church Point." The vestry, or governing body of the church, was established in 1640.

By 1691 the church building had begun to deteriorate and the land around the church was slowly being eroded by the Lynnhaven River. The vestry approved the building of a new church on two acres of land purchased from Ebenezer Taylor. The second Lynnhaven Parish Church was completed in 1692.

As the parish grew the second church was no longer able to meet the needs of the larger congregation. In 1733 the vestry ordered the building of a new church that could accommodate the parish's needs. The third church was accepted by the vestry on June 25, 1736. The last colonial rector of Lynnhaven Parish was the Reverend Robert Dickson. He served as rector of the parish for 25 years. Upon his death in 1776, he left his home, slaves and property to the church. This property, which was to be used as a free school for orphan boys, became known as "Donation Farm." It is from this reference that the church became known as Old Donation Church. The Reverend Dickson was buried under the altar in the 1736 church.

Although records show that Old Donation Church underwent repairs in 1822, it was enjoying regular services and had a healthy congregation. In the years that followed, however, many families moved to the area that we know today as "Kempsville." In 1842, the parish was reorganized to accommodate these new outlying communities and a new church, Emmanuel Episcopal Church, was built in Kempsville.

Soon after Emmanuel Church was completed, Old Donation was abandoned for services. In 1882, a forest fire gutted the abandoned church leaving only the exterior walls standing. Through the interest of Thurmer Hoggard and his family, yearly services were held in the roofless ruins to keep the memory of the old church alive.

In 1911 an organization was founded to raise funds to rebuild Old Donation. Through the enthusiastic and tireless efforts of the Rev. Richard Alfriend and Judge B. D. White, construction was begun in 1912. The church's restoration was finished in 1916 and Old Donation was once again open for services. The church's bell tower was erected in 1923.

The church underwent major repairs in the 1960s to ensure the building's structural integrity. It was during this time that the slate floors were installed. These renovations were completed in 1966. Old Donation is included on the National Register of Historic Places and is one of the stops on the Bayside History Trail.

The parish's third church, built in 1736, and its congregation, dating to 1637, are both among the oldest churches and congregations in the United States.

The Rev. Fred Poteet currently serves as the priest associate for pastoral care following the retirement of the Rev. Robert J. Randall, Jr., as rector in January, 2025.

== See also ==
- Grace Sherwood
- Ferry Plantation House
- National Register of Historic Places listings in Virginia Beach, Virginia
