= Great Neck Point =

Coordinates: 36.899482°N 76.083079°W

Great Neck Point is a point of land and neighborhood on the Lynnhaven River in Virginia Beach, Virginia, United States. It is home to the Adam Keeling House and the Keeling family cemetery.

Before the area was settled by the English colonists, Chesepioc was located at Great Neck Point. It was a village of the Chesepians, the Native American (American Indian) inhabitants of the area during the Woodland Period and later prior to the arrival of the English settlers in 1607. Archaeologists and other persons have found numerous Native American artifacts, such as arrowheads, stone axes, pottery, beads, and skeletons in Great Neck Point.
