= Cape Henry Lighthouses =

Lighthouses in Virginia, United States

- Cape Henry Lighthouse
- U.S. National Register of Historic Places
- U.S. National Historic Landmark
- Virginia Landmarks Register
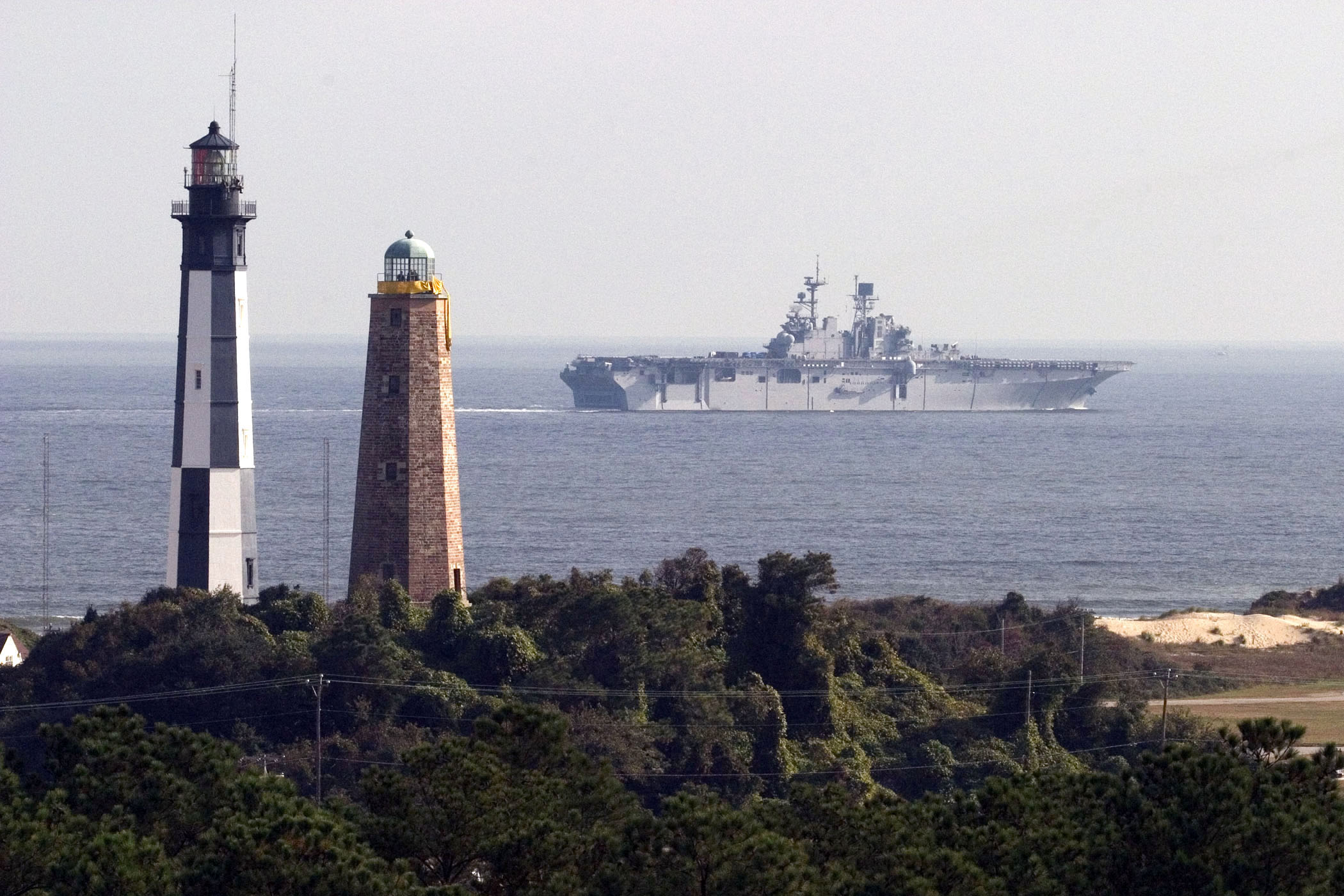
- The new and old lighthouses at Cape Henry

- Location within Virginia Location within the United States
- Location: Virginia Beach, Virginia
- Coordinates: 36°55′32″N 76°0′30″W
- Built: Old Lighthouse, 1792; New lighthouse, 1881
- Architect: Federal Government
- MPS: Light Stations of the United States MPS
- NRHP reference No.: 66000910, 02001439
- VLR No.: 134-0007, 134-0079

Significant dates
- Added to NRHP: October 15, 1966, December 2, 2002
- Designated NHL: April 15, 1970
- Designated VLR: September 9, 1969, September 10, 2003

The Cape Henry Lighthouses are a pair of lighthouses at Cape Henry, the landform marking the southern entrance to the Chesapeake Bay in the U.S. state of Virginia. The location has long been important for the large amount of ocean-going shipping traffic for the harbors, its rivers, and shipping headed to ports on the bay. The original lighthouse was the first authorized by the U.S. government, dating from 1792. It was also the first federal construction project under the Constitution, for an original contract amount of $15,200 (an additional $2,500 was required to finish the lighthouse). A second lighthouse was built a short distance away after concern arose about the stability of the first. Construction began in 1879 and was completed in 1881. Both towers of the light station were designated a National Historic Landmark in 1970.

== History ==
The first work of the new U.S. Federal government, the first Cape Henry lighthouse was built of Aquia and brown sandstone, likely Connecticut or Portland brownstone, by John McComb Jr. and was completed in November, 1792. McComb was one of the architects involved in the construction of New York City Hall and would go on to design other lighthouses. The lighthouse's design was based on the 1767 Cape Henlopen Light. In 1813, the light was extinguished to prevent British ships from using it as a navigational aid, hindering their naval blockade of the Chesapeake. The light was extinguished for the second time and the lens removed by Confederate forces during the American Civil War, but was removed by Union forces and returned in 1863, who depended on the light for navigation to maintain access to nearby Fort Monroe. In the 1870s, inspections by the Lighthouse Service discovered large cracks forming on six out of the eight faces of the tower and concerns soon arose about the safety of the old light at Cape Henry. This led to the construction of a new, taller, lighthouse at Cape Henry in 1881, which stands 350 feet to the northeast of the original tower. The old tower remained standing, used as a daymark and as a basis for triangulation. The lighthouse was fully automated in 1984 and remains in use today.

== Description ==
In 1798, Benjamin Latrobe visited Cape Henry Lighthouse and described it as "an octangular truncated pyramid of eight sides, rising 90 feet to the light..." The Old Cape Henry Lighthouse is 26 feet in diameter at its base, and 16 feet at its top. It was built with Aquia Creek sandstone from the same source as the White House.

The new lighthouse, 157 feet (48 m) tall, was built of cast iron and wrought iron, with a more powerful first-order Fresnel lens. It is the only lighthouse on the Virginia coast that is still equipped with a first-order Fresnel lens.

== Preservation ==
The older lighthouse was acquired in 1930 by Preservation Virginia (formerly known as the Association for the Preservation of Virginia Antiquities). A brick lining and an iron stairway have been added to the interior. The lighthouse is open to the public and a fine view can be enjoyed from its observation platform. It was designated a National Historic Landmark on January 29, 1964. In 2002 the American Society of Civil Engineers designated the lighthouse a National Historic Civil Engineering Landmark.

The lighthouses are located in the city of Virginia Beach within the boundaries of Joint Expeditionary Base East, a Navy base. The Cape Henry Memorial is adjacent to the lighthouses. In 2025, Preservation Virginia used Aquia stone from a supply originally sourced in the 18th century to make repairs to the lighthouse.

== Gallery ==
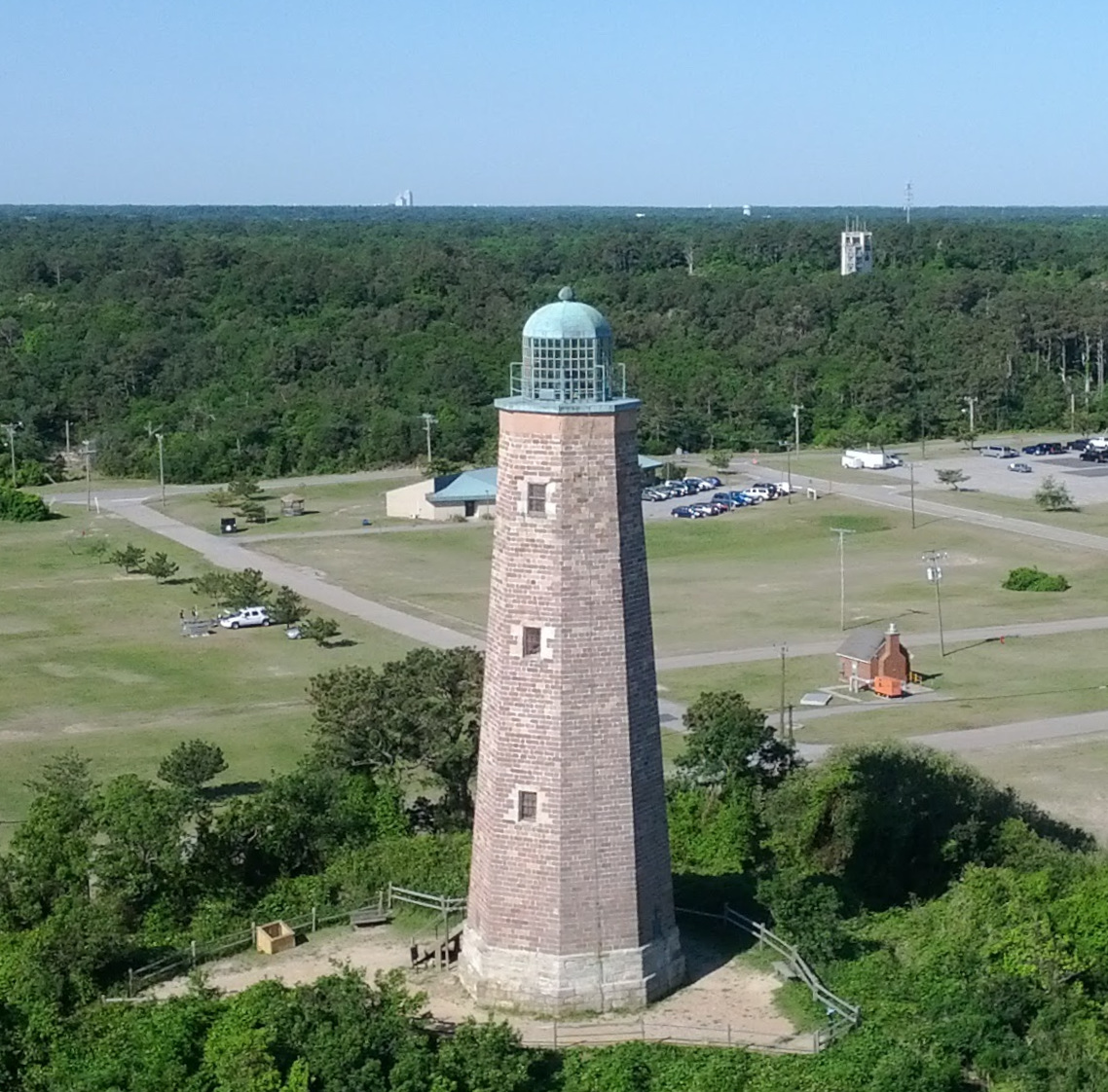
The old Cape Henry lighthouse, as seen from the top of the new Cape Henry lighthouse.

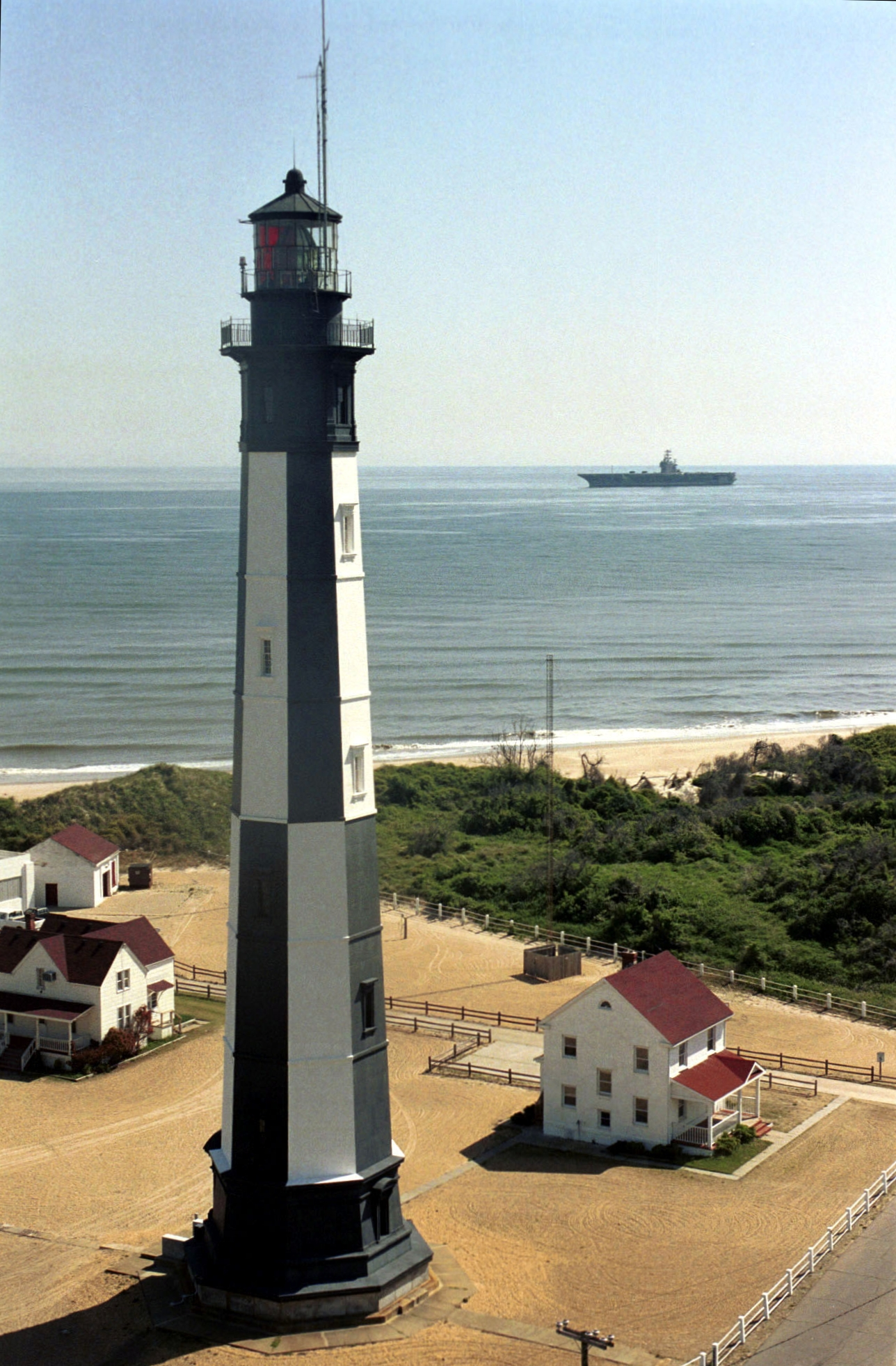
Second tower, modern photo

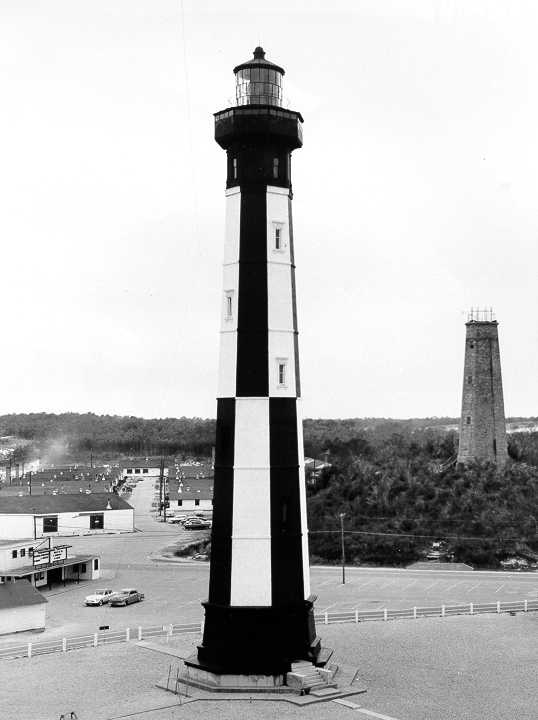
Second tower, U.S. Coast Guard Archive

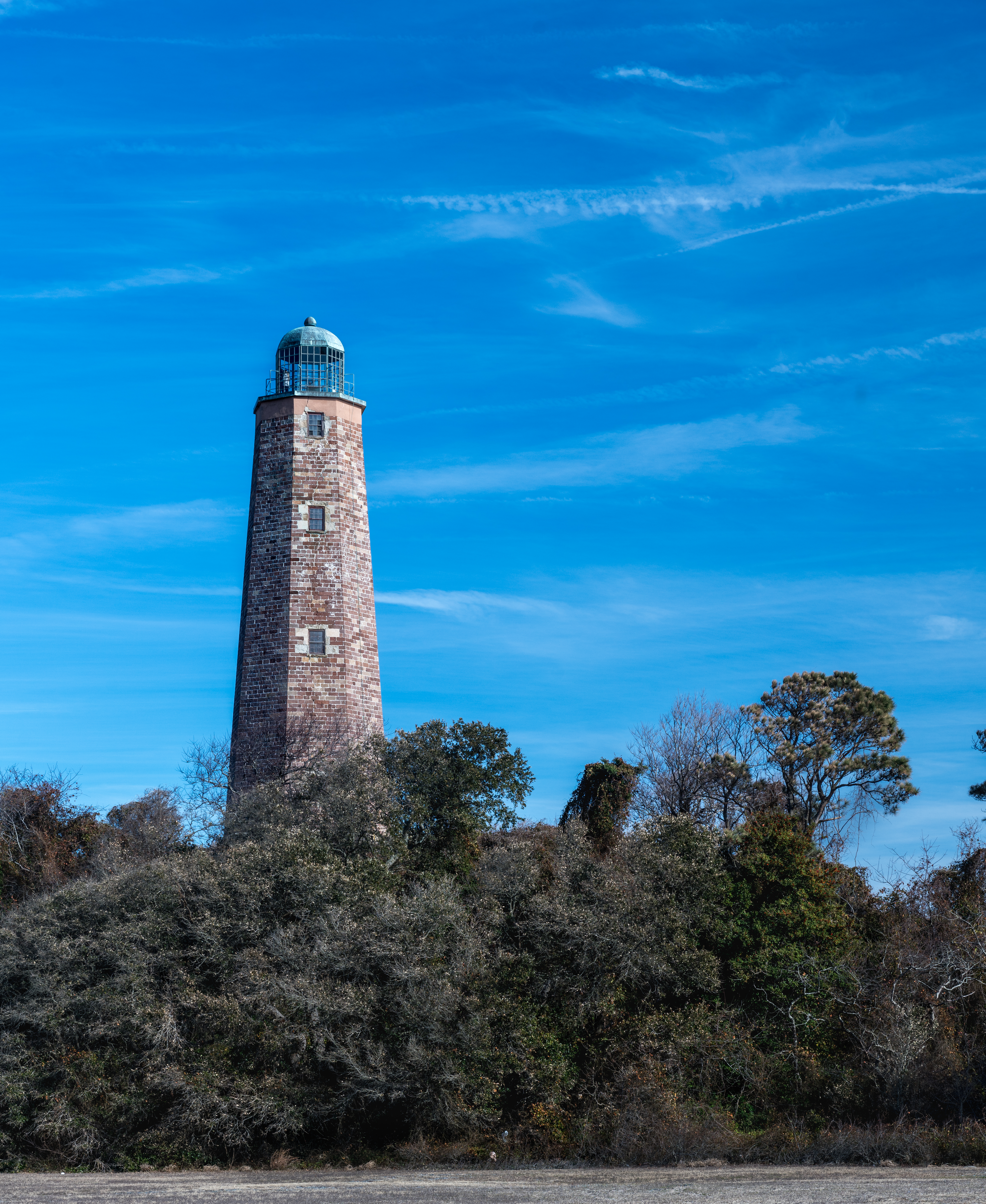
The first Cape Henry Lighthouse, erected 1792, in 2017

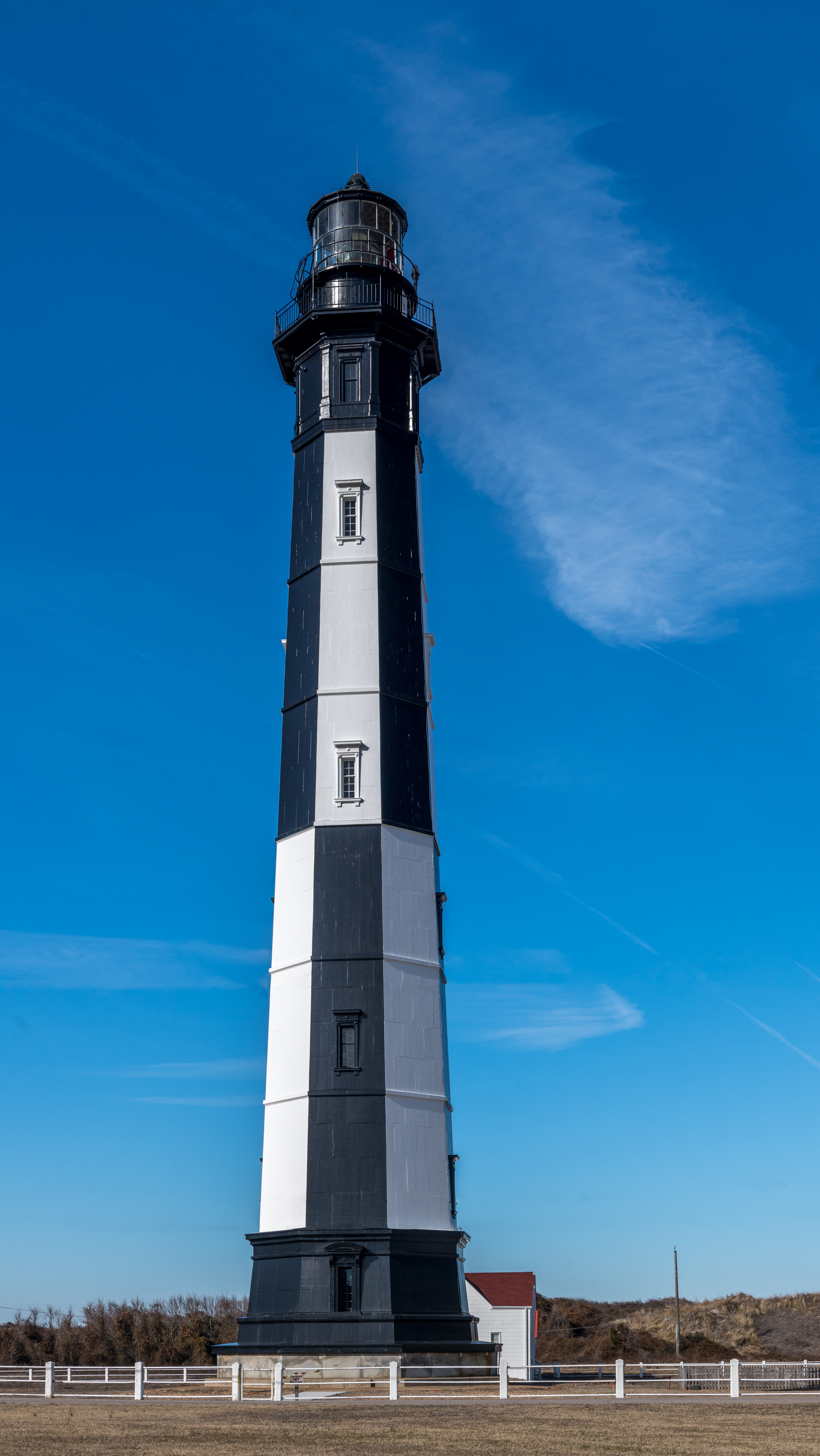
The second Cape Henry Lighthouse, erected 1881, in 2017

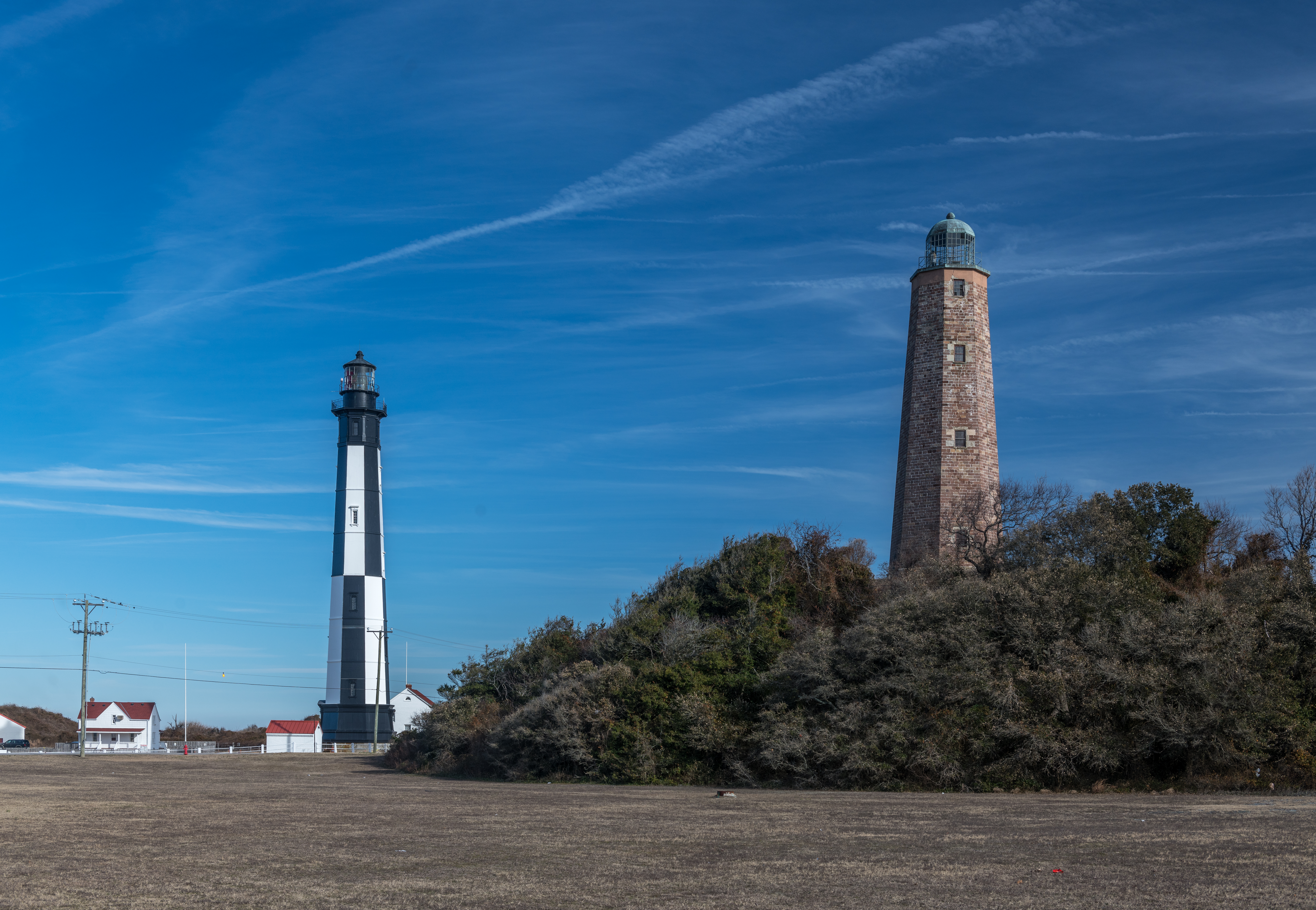
Both Lighthouses in 2017

== See also ==
- First Landing State Park
- Boston Light for more on lighthouse firsts
- List of National Historic Landmarks in Virginia
- National Register of Historic Places listings in Virginia Beach, Virginia
