= Cape Henry Memorial =

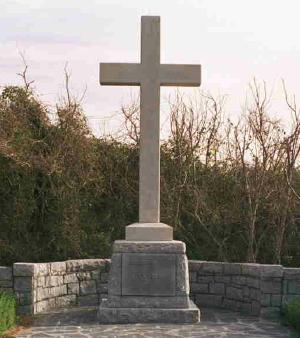
- Memorial cross

- Location within Virginia Location within the United States
- Location: Virginia Beach, Virginia, USA
- Nearest city: Norfolk, Virginia
- Coordinates: 36°55′41″N 76°0′30″W
- Area: 0.25 acres (0.10 ha)
- Governing body: National Park Service
- Website: Cape Henry Memorial

The Cape Henry Memorial commemorates the first landfall at Cape Henry, in Virginia Beach, Virginia, of colonists bound for the Jamestown settlement. After landing on April 26, 1607, they explored the area, named the cape, and set up a cross before proceeding up the James River. A stone cross, set up in 1935 by the Daughters of the American Colonists, stands in the quarter-acre site. The memorial marks the First Landing, the very beginning of what would become British North America and subsequently Anglo Canada and the United States of America.

The Memorial also overlooks the scene of the Battle of the Virginia Capes, in which the French navy prevented the British from reinforcing General Cornwallis, and led to the Franco-American victory at Yorktown. A statue of Admiral Comte de Grasse and a granite memorial honor those who fought in the battle.

Although not memorialized at the park, this was also the location of the earlier smaller naval Battle of Cape Henry in which British and French naval squadrons fought in 1781.

The Cape Henry Memorial is within Joint Expeditionary Base East, but is an isolated unit of Colonial National Historical Park. A national park passport stamp for the Memorial can be obtained at the adjacent Old Cape Henry Light (not formally part of the Memorial).
