= Lynnhaven River =

River in the United States of America

Coordinates: 35°53′45″N 76°5′33″W

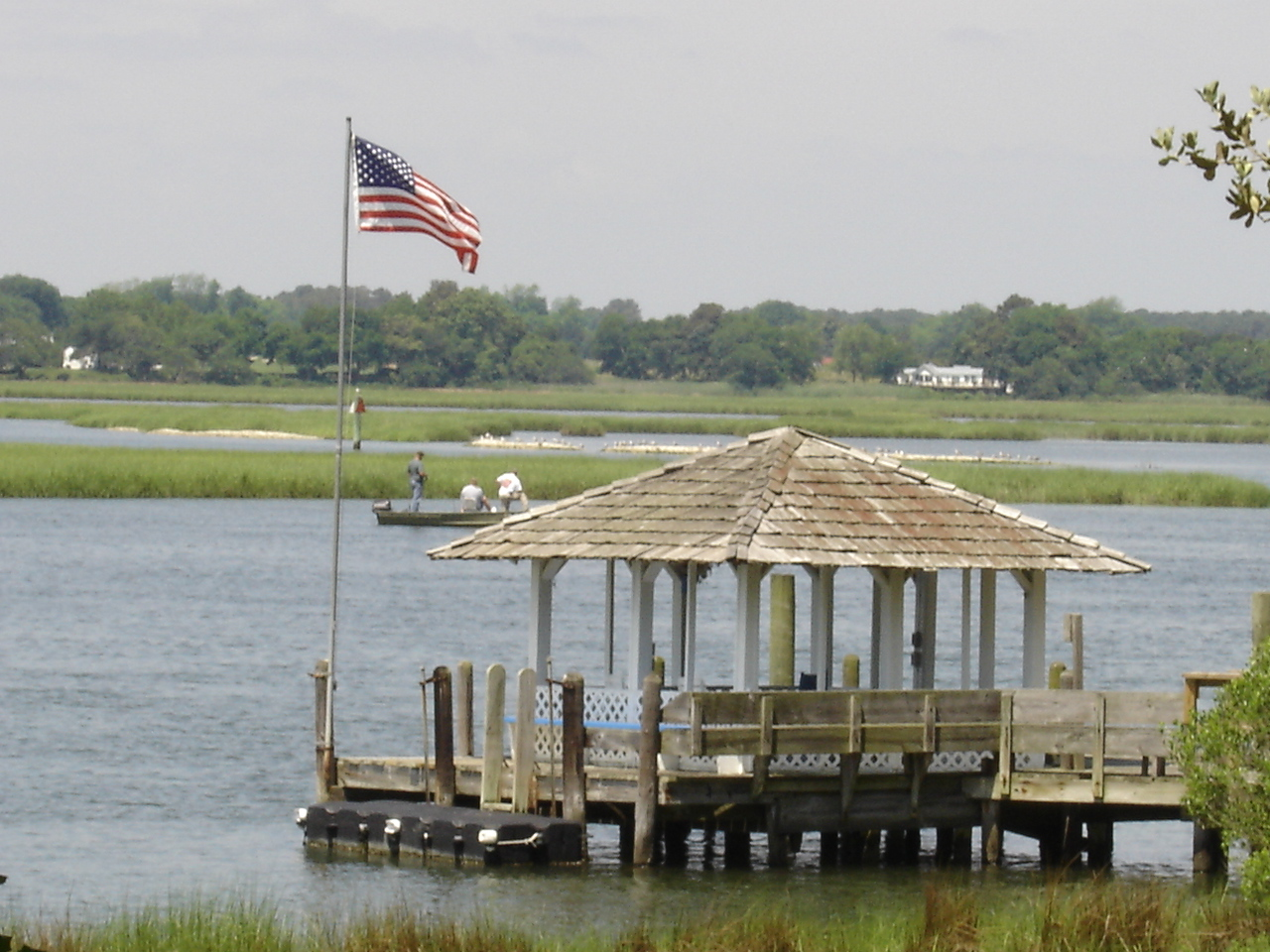
Here, a view of the Lynnhaven River, looking west from Great Neck Point. Much of the river bank is residential; wide salt water marshes make up much of the center.

The Lynnhaven River is a tidal estuary located in the independent city of Virginia Beach, Virginia, in the United States, and flows into the Chesapeake Bay west of Cape Henry at Lynnhaven Inlet, beyond which is Lynnhaven Roads. It has a small, developed watershed covering 64 square miles (170 km^{2}), terminating at Lynnhaven Bay. It was once famous along the East Coast of the United States for its oysters, which declined through pollution and runoff. It is now being restored by the Lynnhaven River Now restoration project based out of the Brock Environmental Center. A proposed comprehensive project for ecosystem restoration of the Lynnhaven River Basin is currently under consideration by the United States Congress.

== History ==
Notable historic residences near the entrance include the Adam Keeling House, Adam Thoroughgood House, and Ferry Plantation House and the area was the site of the early colonial settlement of Henry Town.

The bay was a convenient harbor for coast-wise shipping in the colonial period.

Adam Thoroughgood was from King's Lynn in Norfolk, England. Many locations in Virginia Beach, including the Lynnhaven River, Lynn Shores, Thalia Lynn, and Lynnhaven Road (parkway, drive, etc.) are named Lynn after King's Lynn.

In 1807, it was the site of a British squadron of ships, from whence sailed HMS Leopard in its engagement and capture of USS Chesapeake.

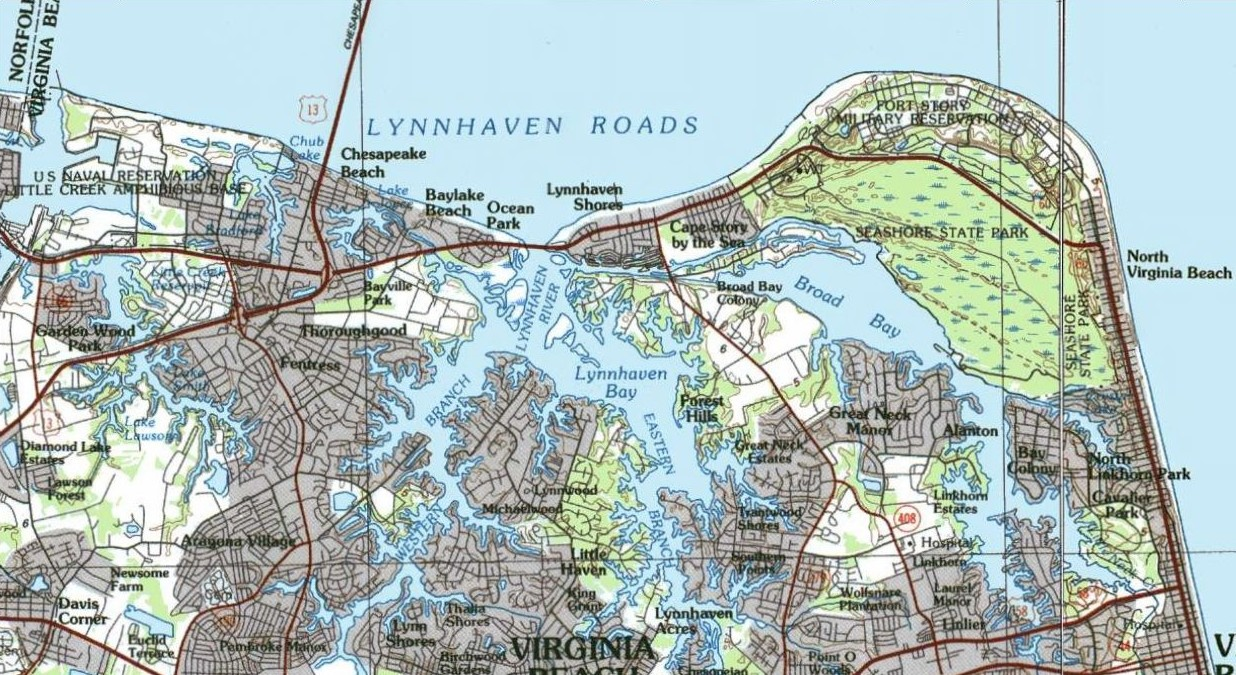
Map of the Lynnhaven River area

== See also ==
- List of rivers of Virginia
