= Cape Henry =

Headland on the Atlantic shore of Virginia

Coordinates: 36°55′29.3″N 76°1′12.4″W

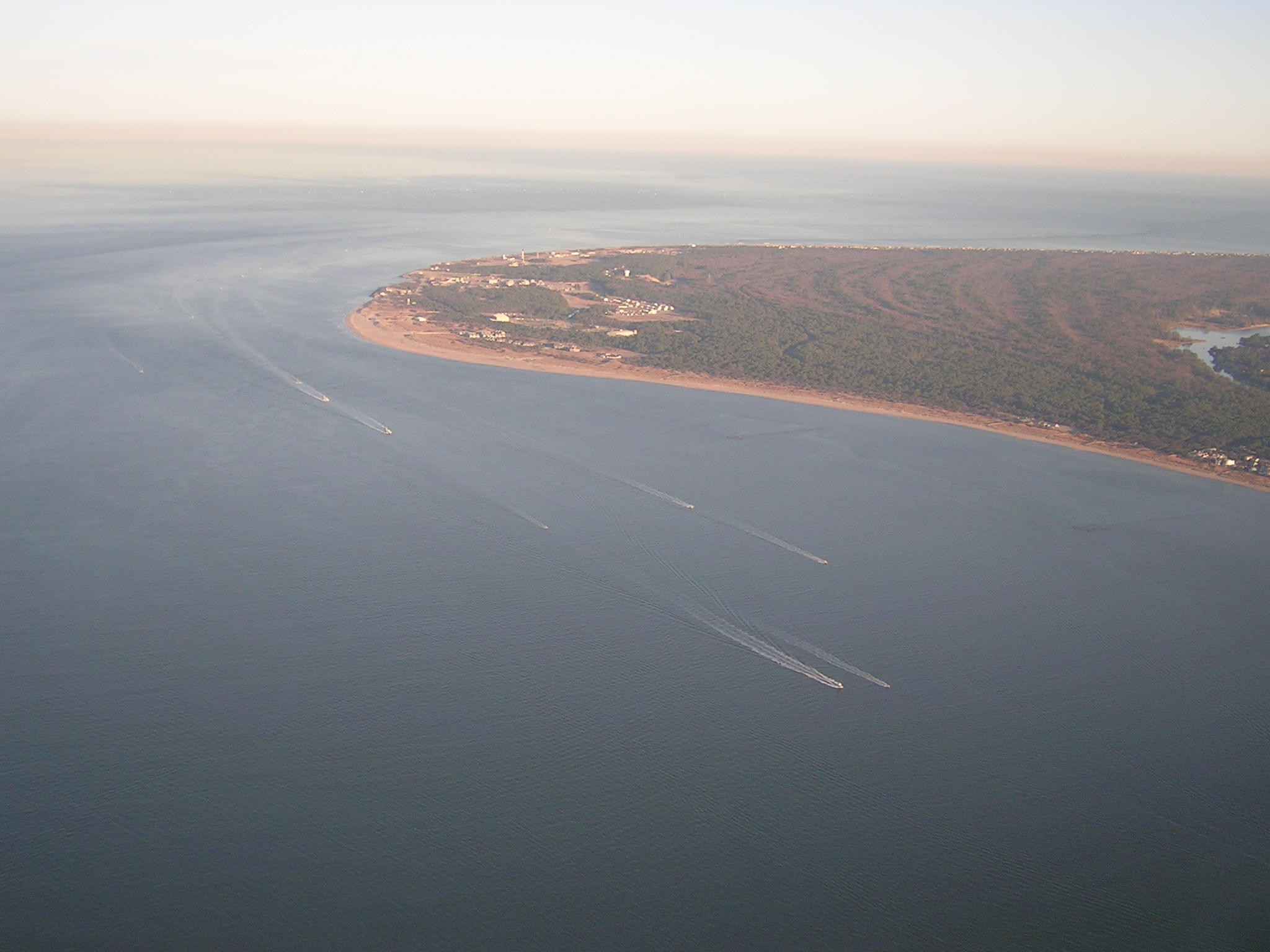
Cape Henry from the air, facing to the east-southeast over the Atlantic Ocean and the gateway to the Chesapeake Bay

Cape Henry is a cape on the Atlantic shore of Virginia located in the northeast corner of Virginia Beach. It is the southern boundary of the entrance to the long estuary of the Chesapeake Bay.

Across the mouth of the bay to the north is Cape Charles the opposite point of the Bay's gateway. Named for two sons of King James I of England in 1607, together Cape Henry and Cape Charles form the Virginia Capes.

== History ==
Cape Henry was named on April 26, 1607, in honor of Henry Frederick, Prince of Wales, the elder of two sons of King James I of England to survive to the age of 18 and heir-apparent to the throne of the Kingdom of England (later united in 1707 with neighboring Scotland as the Kingdom of Great Britain), by an expedition of the London Company branch of the proprietary Virginia Company headed by Captain Christopher Newport. After an unusually long voyage of 144 days from England, it was their first landfall, an event which has come to be called "The First Landing". Soon after this landing the English colonists erected a wooden cross and gave thanks for a successful crossing to a new land. In the First Charter of Virginia, King James I devoted parcels of land for the purpose of spreading the Christian religion. The Charter reads in part: "We greatly commending, and graciously accepting of, their Desires for the Furtherance of so noble a Work, which may, by the Providence of Almighty God, hereafter tend to the Glory of his Divine Majesty, in propagating of Christian Religion to such People, as yet live in Darkness and miserable Ignorance..."

Captain Newport, with his three ships, Susan Constant, the Godspeed, and the Discovery, and the group of 104 men and boys, subsequently explored inland and established Jamestown on an island for protection offshore from the north shore further upstream on the James River which became the first permanent English settlement in North America.

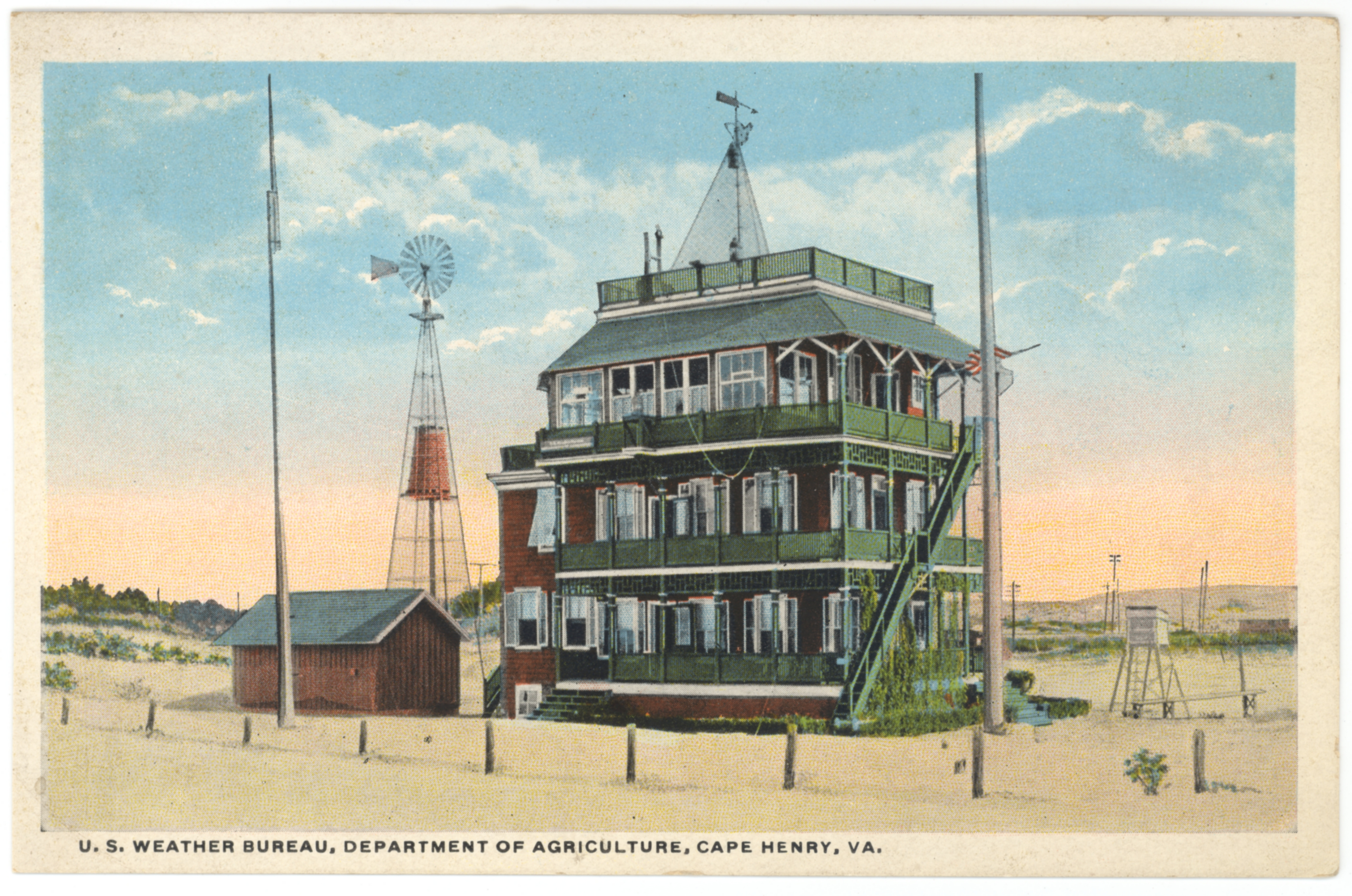
Cape Henry Weather Bureau c. 1900

The following year of 1608, Captain John Smith took a crew with a small boat outfitted with a sail and proceeded north up the Chesapeake Bay exploring and mapping its coasts and rivers, creeks and bays up to the later named Susquehanna River which fed the Bay.

In 1700, three men accused of piracy were executed by gibbeting at Cape Henry: John Houghling, Cornelius Franc, and Francois Delaunée.

In 1781, the waters off of these Virginia Capes and the entrance to the Chesapeake and Hampton Roads harbor were the site of an important naval clash between warships of the Kingdom of France and the Kingdom of Great Britain near the end of the American Revolutionary War (1775–1783) in the Battle of the Capes. The victory of the French Navy over the British Royal Navy cut off the King's Army troops of Lord Charles Cornwallis surrounded, bombarded and under siege for a month at Yorktown, Virginia, a short distance up the Bay on the Western Shore's York River. They had been pursued after a series of clashes for several years in the Southern Theater in Georgia and the Carolinas by rebel patriot regular forces of soldiers under the command of Gen. Nathanael Greene and Daniel Morgan, along with irregular bands of guerrilla partisans sniping and wearing down the Redcoats by attrition. As Cornwallis headed northward to the rich untouched colony of Virginia and also hoping to be reinforced / resupplied or evacuated if necessary on the ragged shores of the Carolina coast or the Chesapeake where British seapower and naval dominance could be brought to bear. The French fleet under Admiral deGrasse sent from the Caribbean Sea and West Indies islands with an unusual naval victory over the British taskforce who also had sent a second fleet from occupied New York retreating back northward which was supposed to reinforce and guard Cornwallis' seaward side. The British general was forced to surrender in October 1781 to a combined jointly commanded American-French Army with German states mercenary allies under Gen. George Washington, Gen. Marquis de Lafayette and French Army troops under Gen. Rochambeau who had deceived Gen. William Howe commander in New York where the Northern Theater had stalemated and sneaked out slipping and gaining several weeks march southward down the East Coast to surprise and catch Cornwallis' Redcoats camped at Yorktown in a siege. Finally for the first time in the six year long rebellion, the insurgents had numerical superiority in numbers and artillery along with adequate cooperating seapower from the French allies. The often little known sea Battle of the Capes a few miles off the American Virginia coast was the nail in the coffin to assure colonial independence as the War ended a year and a half later with the Treaty of Paris in 1783.

== Current features ==
The Cape Henry Memorial commemorates The First Landing of the settlers that established Jamestown. Nearby, the historic Cape Henry Lighthouse was the first in the United States. The railroad passenger station, built in 1902, was served by the original Norfolk Southern Railway. It was restored late in the 20th century and is used as an educational facility by Fort Story, a Navy base located at Cape Henry that was established in 1914. First Landing State Park occupies and protects the rest of the cape itself, as well as some of the nearby area. Shore Drive, US-60, a locally well-known road, facilitates viewing of the rest of the shoreline in Cape Henry.
