= Adam Thoroughgood =

American politician

Captain Adam Thoroughgood
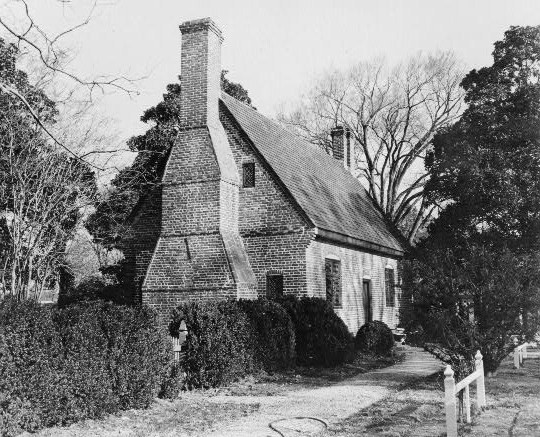
- Adam Thoroughgood House, ca. 1719, built by Adam’s great-grandson, Argall Thoroughgood and his wife, Susannah.
- Born: July 15, 1604; King's Lynn, Norfolk, England
- Died: April 27, 1640 (aged 35); Elizabeth City County, Colony of Virginia
- Resting place: Church Point, Lower Norfolk County, Virginia
- Other name: Adam Thorowgood
- Spouse: Sarah Thoroughgood-Yeardley (née Offley)
- Children: 4

Adam Thoroughgood [Thorowgood] (1604–1640) was an indentured servant and community leader in the Virginia Colony who helped settle the Virginia counties of Elizabeth City, Lower Norfolk and Princess Anne, the latter, known today as the independent city of Virginia Beach.

== Biography ==
Young Thoroughgood was from a prominent family in King's Lynn, Norfolk, England, the ninth son of the Rector of Grimston, Rev. William Thorowgood. He was baptized at St. Botolph's Church in Grimston on July 14, 1604 (as shown in the baptism register). Early in his life he became interested in immigrating to the Americas when he heard about exploits in Virginia from some of the members of Henry Spelman's family who lived in Congham, a mile to the north of Grimston. At the age of 17, he became an indentured servant in order to pay for passage to the Virginia Colony, a project of the Virginia Company of London at the time. Around 1622, he settled in an area south of the Chesapeake Bay and a few miles inland from the Atlantic Ocean. This area had been passed by when the earlier settlements of the London Colony such as Jamestown were established beginning in 1607 in favor of locations further inland which would be less susceptible to attacks by other European forces, such as the Spanish.

Having served his period of indenture, Adam returned to England, only to return to Virginia with a wife and 105 men. He was granted a large landholding and became a leading citizen of the area. He was elected to the House of Burgesses in 1629, 1629–1630 and 1632, to the Governor's Council, and as a Justice of the Court. He also became a captain in the local militia and started one of the first ferry services in Hampton Roads. And he exported tobacco, which was fast becoming the cash crop which early colonists needed.

The London Company lost its charter in 1624 and Virginia became a royal colony. In 1634, the colony was divided into shires, a term still in use in Virginia 350 years later, and was soon renamed counties. Adam is credited with using his place of birth in England when helping name New Norfolk County when it was formed from Elizabeth City County in 1637. From New Norfolk County, there were several additional smaller entities formed including, most notably Norfolk County, which existed from 1691 to 1963 and is now the City of Chesapeake, and most famously, Lower Norfolk County which became the modern City of Norfolk.

Despite his widespread and long-lasting influence in South Hampton Roads, his choice of residence was along the Lynnhaven River, also named for his home in England. In 1635, he earned a land patent for over 5,000 acres (20 km^{2}) in this area for having earlier persuaded 105 new residents to settle in Virginia, including Augustine Warner, an ancestor of both President George Washington and General Robert E. Lee.

Thoroughgood appears to have had the foresight to realize earlier than many other leaders that Lower Norfolk County (which encompassed the modern cities of Portsmouth, Norfolk, Chesapeake, and Virginia Beach) was too large for a single site for convenient worship and court affairs. He led the effort to establish a second parish church (now known as Old Donation Episcopal Church), a court, and a glebe house at what was then known as Churches Point on the Lynnhaven River in the eastern portion of the county, that was later subdivided to form Princess Anne County in 1691. The present City of Virginia Beach was incorporated in 1963.

In 1640, at the young age of 36, Thoroughgood suddenly became ill and died. The Adam Thoroughgood House is now an historic museum.

== Family ==
Coat of Arms of Adam Thoroughgood

Adam Thorowgood married Sarah Offley of London. Before his death in August 1642 they had 4 children:

- Adam, who became Lt. Colonel
- Ann, who married Job Chandler of Maryland
- Sarah who also married a Maryland gentleman
- Elizabeth, who married John Michael Sr., a member of the Board of Commissioners of Northampton County, Virginia.

His widow Sarah married several more times, first to Captain John Gookin, and lastly to Francis Yeardley, youngest son of Governor Sir George Yeardley.

== See also ==
- Ferry Plantation House
