= Culture in Virginia Beach =

Virginia Beach, Virginia is a city that has become a popular tourist destination in recent years on account of its historical, scientific, and performing arts.

== Overview ==
The Virginia Aquarium & Marine Science Center (formerly the Virginia Marine Science Museum) is a popular aquarium near the oceanfront that features the 300,000-gallon Norfolk Canyon Aquarium, containing sand tiger, nurse and brown sharks, as well as sting rays and other large open-ocean dwellers. There is also a 70,000-gallon sea turtle aquarium, sea turtle hatchling laboratory, hands-on ocean exploration exhibits, jellyfish and octopus aquariums, and even a life-size model of a humpback whale. Other features include the Owls Creek salt marsh and a nature trail.

The Farm Bureau Live (former The Verizon Wireless Amphitheater) features a wide variety of popular shows and concerts, ranging from Kenny Chesney to Gretchen Wilson to Coldplay to Ozzfest. The Sandler Center, a 1200-seat performing arts theatre, opened in the Virginia Beach Town Center in November 2007.

Virginia Beach is home to many sites of historical importance, and has 18 sites on the National Register of Historic Places. Such sites include the Adam Thoroughgood House (one of the oldest surviving colonial homes in Virginia), the Francis Land House (a 200-year-old plantation), the Cape Henry Lights and nearby Cape Henry Light Station (a second tower), Bayville Farm, DeWitt Cottage, Ferry Farm Plantation, Dr. John Miller-Masury House, Adam Keeling House, Old Donation Church, Pembroke Manor, Pleasant Hall, Shirley Hall (Devereaux House), Thomas Murray House, U.S. Coast Guard Station (Seatack), Upper Wolfsnare (Brick House Farm), Weblin House, and Wishart Boush House and Wolfsnare.

The history of one house represented a concise story of Lower Norfolk County's past. In 1649 the English couple William and Susannah Moseley migrated with their family to Lower Norfolk County from Rotterdam, the Netherlands, where he had been a steward of the English Court as a member of the Merchant Adventurers Company of London. They were a mature couple in their 40s and came with wealth to set up trade. On the Eastern Branch Elizabeth River, they built a mansion with Dutch-style gambrel roof, reflecting their years of residency and trade in Rotterdam. The house was first known as Greenwich. In the 18th century it was called Rolleston Hall, and was probably added to. The brick mansion stood for more than 200 years and burned down in the late 19th century. William Moseley was a commissioner of Lower Norfolk County from 1649 to his death in 1655. His son Arthur Moseley was elected to the House of Burgesses. Moseley descendants were active in Virginia and numerous other Southern states' political affairs.

Before the Civil War, the mansion had passed out of the Moseley family and was owned by former governor Henry A. Wise of Virginia. He and his family left the house in 1861 during the American Civil War to seek refuge elsewhere. He became a Brigadier General for the Confederate Army. After the war, Wise attempted to reclaim the house while a prisoner on parole, but was refused by the Union command as he had taken up residence elsewhere in 1861. By the end of the Civil War, the Freedmen's Bureau had taken over the mansion and operated it as a school for 200 freedmen.

The Edgar Cayce Hospital for Research and Enlightenment was established in Virginia Beach in 1928 with 60 beds. Cayce was a psychic from Kentucky who claimed healing abilities and made prophesies. Cayce resided in Virginia Beach until he died on January 3, 1945. His followers are still active in Virginia Beach. Atlantic University was opened by Cayce in 1930; it closed two years later but was re-opened in 1985. Atlantic University was originally intended for study of Cayce's readings and research on spiritual subjects.

== Films ==
Several films have been made in or near the city: Deep Impact (1998), The Dark Angel: Psycho Kickboxer (1997), Hearts in Atlantis (2001), Judges (2005), The Killing Kind (2004), Moving (2002), Navy SEALs (1990), The Satan Killer (1993) and Too Young the Hero (1988; TV film). Mission: Impossible III (2006) was filmed at the Chesapeake Bay Bridge-Tunnel, which is connected to Virginia Beach.

== Parks and outdoor recreation ==
Virginia Beach is home to 208 city parks, encompassing over 4,000 acres (16 km²), including neighborhood parks, community parks, district parks, and other open spaces. Each park is unique and offers something for everyone, from wide open spaces to playgrounds, picnic shelters, and ballfields.

Perhaps one of the most well-known parks is the Mount Trashmore Park, clearly visible from I-264. The park is 165 acres (668,000 m²). The mountain is 60 ft (18 m) high and over 800 ft (240 m) long, and was created by compacting layers of solid waste and clean soil. The park also features two lakes: Lake Windsor and Lake Trashmore. Lake Trashmore is stocked and may be fished.

Another major park in the city is Great Neck Park, a 70-acre (283,000 m²) park located in the Lynnhaven District. Facilities include five large group shelters, mini-shelters, family picnic tables and grills, three playgrounds, horseshoe pits, volleyball courts, vending machines, walking trails, four baseball fields, as well as a gazebo located at the end of a scenic walkway overlooking the Lynnhaven River.

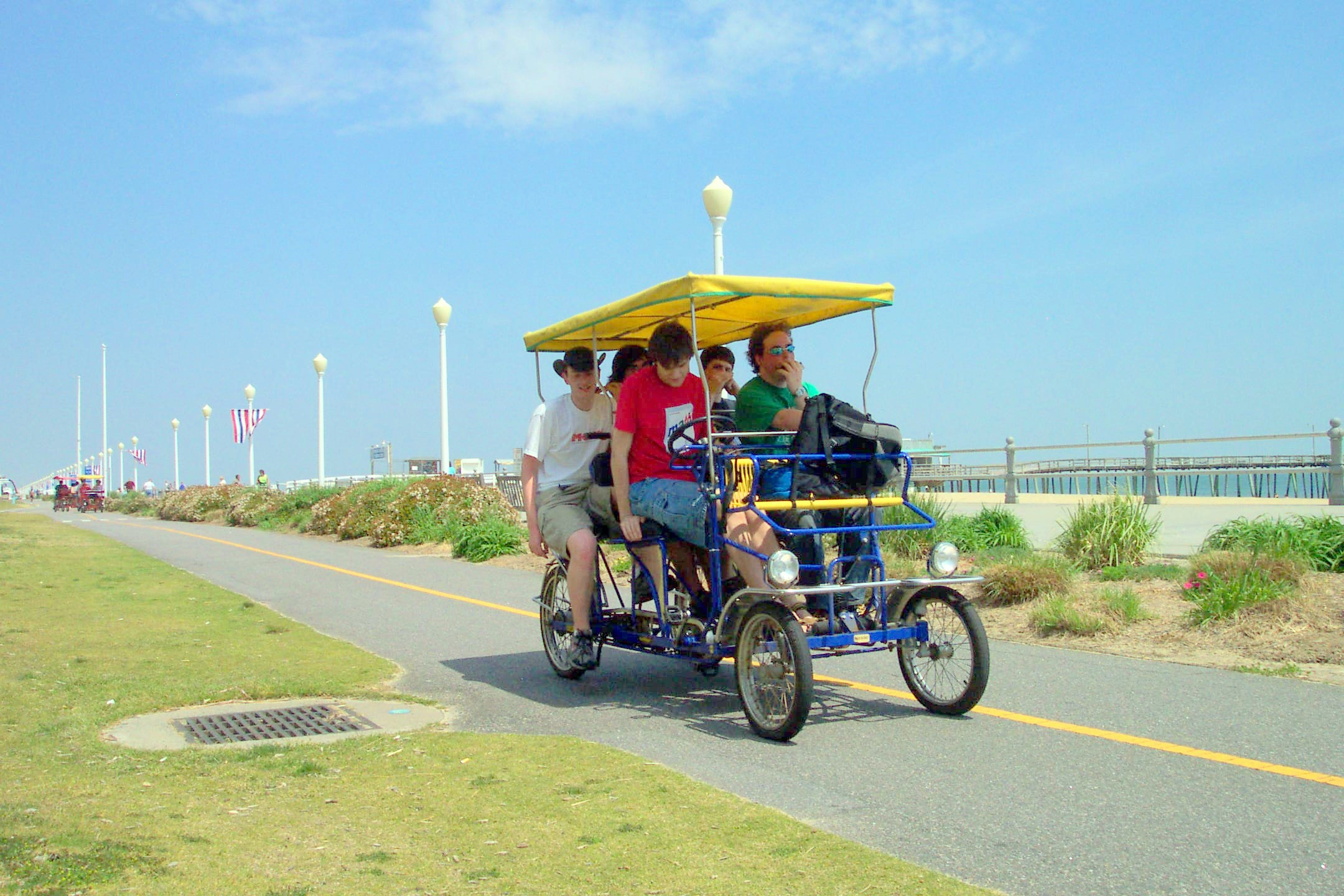
People enjoying rental bicycle on the Boardwalk

The Back Bay National Wildlife Refuge, established in 1938, is an 8,000-acre (32 km²) fresh water refuge that borders the Atlantic Ocean on the east and Back Bay on the west. The barrier islands feature large sand dunes, maritime forests, fresh water marshes, ponds, ocean beach, and large impoundments for wintering wildfowl. It is managed by the U.S. Fish and Wildlife Service.

First Landing State Park and False Cape State Park are both located in coastal areas within the city's corporate limits as well.

Munden Point is a park located in the deep southern end of the city, which is known for being rural.

Additionally, the famous three-mile (5 km) boardwalk at the oceanfront is often packed with entertainment, outdoor cafes, concerts and people. The Neptune Festival is an outdoor festival held annually in September on the boardwalk.

The Naval Aviation Monument Park was formally dedicated on May 6, 2006, by the Hampton Roads Squadron of the Naval Aviation Foundation Association. Planned since 1997 in partnership with the City of Virginia Beach, the park features heroic-scale statuary and reliefs to tell the history of Naval Aviation.

== Points of interest ==
- Adam Keeling House
- Adam Thoroughgood House
- Back Bay National Wildlife Refuge
- Cape Henry
- Cape Henry Light
- Cape Henry Memorial
- False Cape State Park
- First Landing State Park
- Fleet Combat Training Center Atlantic
- Joint Expeditionary Base East
- Francis Land House
- Henry Town recreation
- Little Creek Naval Amphibious Base
- Lynnhaven Mall
- Lynnhaven House
- Military Aviation Museum
- Mount Trashmore Park
- Naval Air Station Oceana
- Norwegian Lady Statue
- Ocean Breeze Waterpark
- Virginia Beach Surf & Rescue Museum (Seatack)
- Pembroke Mall
- Princess Anne Athletic Complex
- Tidewater Arboretum
- Virginia Beach Convention Center
- Virginia Beach Town Center
- Verizon Wireless Virginia Beach Amphitheater
- Virginia Aquarium
- Virginia Beach Oceanfront
- Virginia Beach Sportsplex

== Sports ==
Virginia Beach has no major league professional sports teams or spectator sports. Since Norfolk contains the central business district of Hampton Roads, most of the major spectator sports are located there. While the Hampton Roads area has been recently considered as a viable prospect for major-league professional sports, and regional leaders have attempted to obtain Major League Baseball, NBA and NHL franchises in the recent past, no team has yet relocated to the area. It is considered (after Las Vegas) the largest metropolitan area in the country without a major professional sports team, being larger than a number of other metropolitan areas who currently host professional teams in the 4 major sports.

There are two soccer teams, the Hampton Roads Piranhas, a men's team in the USL Premier Development League, and a women's team by the same name in the W-League, the de facto top women's league after the suspension of the Women's United Soccer Association. The Piranhas play at the main stadium of the Virginia Beach Sportsplex, which also contains the central training site for the U.S. women's national field hockey team.

The city is also home to the East Coast Surfing Championships, an annual contest of more than 100 of the world's top professional surfers and an estimated 400 amateur surfers. This is North America's oldest surfing contest, and features combined cash prizes of $55,000.

There are also eleven golf courses open to the public in the city, as well as four country club layouts and 36 military holes at NAS Oceana's Aeropines course. Among the best-known public courses are Hell's Point Golf Club and Virginia Beach National, the latter of which hosts the Virginia Beach Open, a Nationwide Tour event, each April.

There are a handful of gyms in the Virginia Beach area that are known for their gymnastics.

The North American Sand Soccer Championship is held once a year at the beach. The tournament includes the Pro/Am competition, which brings teams from all over the world to compete in the tournament.

Virginia Beach was the host of a Rock 'n' Roll Half Marathon each year on Labor Day weekend in conjunction with the American Music Festival from 2001 to 2021. It was one of the largest Half Marathons in the world. The final 3 miles (4.8 km) were on the Virginia Beach boardwalk.

== Media ==
Virginia Beach's daily newspaper is the Virginian-Pilot. Other papers include the Port Folio Weekly, the New Journal and Guide, and the Hampton Roads Business Journal.

Virginia Wesleyan College publishes its own newspaper, Marlin Chronicles. Hampton Roads Magazine serves as a bi-monthly regional magazine for Virginia Beach and the Hampton Roads area. Hampton Roads Times serves as an online magazine for all the Hampton Roads cities and counties. Virginia Beach is served by a variety of radio stations on the AM and FM dials, with towers located around the Hampton Roads area.

Virginia Beach is also served by several television stations. Major network television affiliates include:

Channel	Callsign	Network(s)	Website
3	WTKR	(CBS)	http://www.wtkr.com/
10	WAVY	(NBC)	http://www.wavy.com
13	WVEC	(ABC)	http://www.wvec.com/
15	WHRO	(PBS)	http://www.whro.org/
27	WGNT	(CW)	http://www.cw27.com/
33	WTVZ	(MyNetworkTV)	http://www.mytvz.com
43	WVBT	(Fox)	https://web.archive.org/web/20080214194335/http://www.myfoxhamptonroads.com//
49	WPXV	(ION Television)	https://web.archive.org/web/20080215223141/http://www.ionline.tv//

Virginia Beach residents also can receive independent stations, such as WSKY broadcasting on channel 4 from the Outer Banks of North Carolina and WGBS-LD broadcasting on channel 11 from Hampton. Virginia Beach is served by Cox Cable which provides LNC 5, a local 24-hour cable news television network and Verizon FiOS. DirecTV and Dish Network are also popular as an alternative to cable television in Virginia Beach.
