= Briarwood =

Briarwood can refer to:

- Briar root wood (tree heath), a type of wood used for making smoking pipes

== Communities ==
United States

- Briarwood, Kentucky
- Briarwood, New Jersey (in Mercer County)
- Briarwood East, New Jersey (in Middlesex County)
- Briarwood, Queens, New York
- Briarwood, North Dakota
- Briarwood, Little Rock, Arkansas, a neighborhood
- Briarwood, Saskatoon, Saskatchewan, a neighbourhood

== Other places ==
United States

- Briarwood College, Connecticut
- Briarwood Elementary School (disambiguation), several
- Briarwood Mall, Ann Arbor, Michigan
- Briarwood Presbyterian Church, Birmingham, Alabama
- Briarwood (Charleston, West Virginia), listed on the National Register of Historic Places (NRHP) in 1984
- Briarwood (Virginia Beach, Virginia), listed on the NRHP
