= National Register of Historic Places listings in Virginia Beach, Virginia =

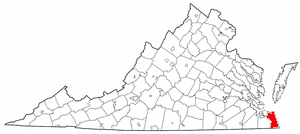
Location of Virginia Beach in Virginia

This is a list of the National Register of Historic Places listings in Virginia Beach, Virginia.

This is intended to be a complete list of the properties and districts on the National Register of Historic Places in the independent city of Virginia Beach, Virginia, United States. The locations of National Register properties and districts for which the latitude and longitude coordinates are included below, may be seen in an online map.

There are 37 properties and districts listed on the National Register in the city, including 2 National Historic Landmarks. Another property was once listed but has been removed.

This National Park Service list is complete through NPS recent listings posted April 10, 2026.

== Current listings ==
| | Name on the Register | Image | Date listed | Location | Description |
|---|---|---|---|---|---|
| 1 | 37th Street Cottages Historic District | 37th Street Cottages Historic District | May 19, 2025 (#100011842) | 201, 203, 205 37th Street; 36°51′54″N 75°58′49″W | |
| 2 | Beach Carousel Motel | Beach Carousel Motel | August 19, 2024 (#100010720) | 1300 Pacific Avenue; 36°50′30″N 75°58′28″W | |
| 3 | Blue Marlin Lodge | Blue Marlin Lodge | October 25, 2022 (#100008322) | 2411 Pacific Ave. 36°51′10″N 75°58′39″W | |
| 4 | Briarwood | Briarwood | August 22, 2012 (#12000547) | 1500 Southwick Rd. 36°51′39″N 76°00′50″W | |
| 5 | Camp Pendleton-State Military Reservation Historic District | Camp Pendleton-State Military Reservation Historic District | September 26, 2005 (#04000852) | Roughly bounded by General Booth Boulevard, S. Birdneck Rd., and the Atlantic Ocean; 36°48′44″N 75°59′06″W | |
| 6 | Cape Henry (Second Tower) Light Station | Cape Henry (Second Tower) Light Station | December 2, 2002 (#02001439) | Atlantic Ave. 36°55′35″N 76°00′26″W | |
| 7 | Cape Henry Lighthouse | Cape Henry Lighthouse | October 15, 1966 (#66000910) | Atlantic Ave. at U.S. Route 60; 36°55′33″N 76°00′29″W | |
| 8 | Cavalier Hotel | Cavalier Hotel | May 19, 2014 (#14000239) | 4200 Pacific Ave. 36°52′09″N 75°59′01″W | |
| 9 | Cavalier Shores Historic District | Cavalier Shores Historic District | April 2, 2019 (#100003606) | Generally bounded by 42nd St./Cavalier Dr., Hollies Rd., 45th St., and the Atlantic Ocean; 36°52′20″N 75°59′02″W | |
| 10 | Chesapeake Beach Historic District | | October 16, 2024 (#100010915) | Fentress Avenue, Lauderdale Avenue, Lookout Road, Pleasure Avenue, and Seaview Avenue; 36°54′56″N 76°07′39″W | |
| 11 | Crest Kitchenette Motel | Crest Kitchenette Motel | October 25, 2022 (#100008323) | 3614 Atlantic Ave. 36°51′54″N 75°58′47″W | |
| 12 | Ferry Plantation House | Ferry Plantation House | January 20, 2005 (#04001545) | 4136 Cheswick Ln. 36°51′43″N 76°07′05″W | |
| 13 | Green Hill | Green Hill | February 5, 2013 (#12001273) | 1721 Lovetts Pond Lane; 36°53′58″N 76°03′17″W | |
| 14 | The Hermitage | The Hermitage | February 14, 2008 (#08000079) | 4200 Hermitage; 36°53′20″N 76°07′13″W | |
| 15 | Holland-de Witt Cottage | Holland-de Witt Cottage | June 16, 1988 (#88000748) | 1113 Atlantic Ave. 36°50′26″N 75°58′21″W | Name change approved March 6, 2026; formerly just "de Witt Cottage". |
| 16 | Jefferson Manor Motel Apartments | Jefferson Manor Motel Apartments | May 12, 2021 (#100006519) | 3300 Pacific Ave. 36°51′41″N 75°58′48″W | |
| 17 | Keeling House | Keeling House | June 19, 1973 (#73002297) | 3157 Adam Keeling Rd. 36°54′02″N 76°04′45″W | |
| 18 | L & J Gardens Neighborhood Historic District | L & J Gardens Neighborhood Historic District | August 30, 2022 (#100008084) | Northampton Blvd., Norwich Ave., Maywood Blvd., and Wesleyan Dr. 36°52′30″N 76°11′13″W | |
| 19 | Francis Land House | Francis Land House | May 12, 1975 (#75002118) | 3133 Virginia Beach Boulevard; 36°50′32″N 76°04′46″W | A boundary decrease was approved May 19, 2025. |
| 20 | Lynnhaven House | Lynnhaven House | November 12, 1969 (#69000363) | East of the junction of Wishart Rd. and Independence Boulevard; 36°52′24″N 76°07′37″W | A boundary decrease and renaming (from Wishart-Boush House) were approved April 3, 2025. |
| 21 | Dr. John Miller-Masury House | Dr. John Miller-Masury House | May 23, 1997 (#97000488) | 515 Wilder Point; 36°52′42″N 75°59′31″W | |
| 22 | Thomas Murray House | Thomas Murray House | May 19, 2004 (#04000482) | 3425 S. Crestline Dr. 36°49′33″N 76°12′49″W | |
| 23 | Oceana Neighborhood Historic District | Oceana Neighborhood Historic District | September 18, 2017 (#100001645) | Indiana, Louisa, Michigan, New York, and Ohio Aves., Middle, Roselynn, and West Lns., Oceana, Southern, and Virginia Beach Boulevards; 36°50′28″N 76°00′54″W | |
| 24 | Old Donation Church | Old Donation Church | April 13, 1972 (#72001534) | 4449 N. Witch Duck Rd. 36°52′01″N 76°07′44″W | |
| 25 | Pembroke Manor | Pembroke Manor | February 26, 1970 (#70000887) | North of the junction of U.S. Route 58 and Constitution Dr. 36°51′08″N 76°08′02″W | |
| 26 | Pleasant Hall | Pleasant Hall | January 25, 1973 (#73002229) | 5184 Princess Anne Rd. 36°49′40″N 76°09′44″W | |
| 27 | Pleasant Ridge School Historic District | Pleasant Ridge School Historic District | October 11, 2024 (#100010898) | 1392 Princess Anne Road; 36°40′58″N 76°01′22″W | |
| 28 | Seashore State Park Historic District | Seashore State Park Historic District | November 16, 2005 (#05001267) | 2500 Shore Dr. 36°54′58″N 76°02′26″W | Now known as First Landing State Park |
| 29 | Seatack Historic District | | May 28, 2024 (#100010348) | Ackiss Ave, Americus Ave, Beautiful St, Bells Rd, Birdneck Rd, Brooklyn Ave, Burford Ave, Butts Ln, Carver Ave, Frazee Ln. Hope Ave. Hughes Ave, Longstreet Ave. Loretta Ln, Norfolk Ave, Old Virginia Beach Rd. Olds Ln, Owls Creek Ln, Sea St, Summerville Ct; 36°50′36″N 75°59′50″W | |
| 30 | Shirley Hall | Shirley Hall | February 5, 1999 (#99000144) | 1109 S. Bay Shore Dr. 36°52′25″N 76°00′27″W | |
| 31 | Thoroughgood House | Thoroughgood House | October 15, 1966 (#66000921) | 1636 Parish Rd. 36°53′37″N 76°06′48″W | |
| 32 | Virginia Beach Surf & Rescue Museum | Virginia Beach Surf & Rescue Museum | July 11, 1979 (#79003304) | Atlantic Ave. and 24th St. 36°51′08″N 75°58′32″W | |
| 33 | Upper Wolfsnare | Upper Wolfsnare | March 26, 1975 (#75002119) | East of the junction of Potters and London Bridge Rds. 36°50′27″N 76°02′20″W | |
| 34 | Virginia Beach Courthouse Village and Municipal Center Historic District | Virginia Beach Courthouse Village and Municipal Center Historic District | June 4, 2018 (#100002196) | Courthouse Dr. and Mattaponi, N. Landing, and Princess Anne Rds. 36°45′04″N 76°03′24″W | |
| 35 | Weblin House | Weblin House | November 8, 1974 (#74002248) | 5588 Moore's Pond Rd. 36°52′31″N 76°09′59″W | A boundary decrease was approved April 16, 2026. |
| 36 | Woodhouse House | Woodhouse House | April 24, 2007 (#07000372) | 3067 W. Neck Rd. 36°43′41″N 76°03′11″W | |
| 37 | Woodhurst Neighborhood Historic District | | March 7, 2023 (#100008701) | Graham, Indian Run, and Mill Dam Rds., Strawberry Ln. and, Woodhurst Dr. 36°52′36″N 76°01′57″W | |

== Former listing ==
| | Name on the Register | Image | Date listed | Date removed | Location | City or town | Description |
|---|---|---|---|---|---|---|---|
| 1 | Bayville Farm | | May 19, 1980 (#80004317) | June 4, 2008 | Off VA 650; 36°53′59″N 76°06′39″W | Virginia Beach | Destroyed by fire 2007 |

== See also ==
- List of National Historic Landmarks in Virginia
- National Register of Historic Places listings in Virginia
