= Adam Keeling House =

Historic house in Virginia, United States

- Keeling House
- U.S. National Register of Historic Places
- Virginia Landmarks Register
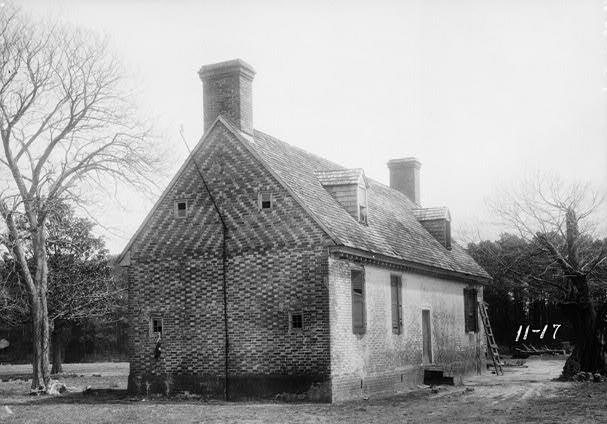
- View of north and west (rear) facades. Note the unique decorative glazed headers. Image courtesy of Historic American Buildings Survey (HABS).

- Location within Virginia Location within the United States
- Location: 3157 Adam Keeling Road, Virginia Beach, Virginia
- Coordinates: 36°54′2.2″N 76°4′44.8″W
- Built: circa 1735
- Architectural style: Pre-Georgian
- NRHP reference No.: 73002297
- VLR No.: 134-0018

Significant dates
- Added to NRHP: June 19, 1973
- Designated VLR: April 17, 1973

The Adam Keeling House is a historic house in Virginia Beach, Virginia, United States.

Dendrochronology undertaken by the Oxford Tree-Ring Laboratory revealed that house was constructed of timbers felled in 1734–1735, pointing to a construction date of circa 1735. It is among the oldest surviving houses in Virginia Beach. Situated on Adam Keeling Road in Great Neck Point on the Lynnhaven River, The Keeling House is known for decorative glazed headers and a center hall design, which is common in Tidewater Virginia British colonial architecture.

When built, the house was in rural Princess Anne County, but today the house sits in the middle of a suburban neighborhood. The house is privately owned, though it can be seen from the street. It is the oldest continuously occupied house in Virginia. A cemetery of family graves is north of the intersection of Adam Keeling Road and Lynn Cove Lane.

Through much of the 20th century, the house was known as Ye Dudlies. Other houses from the Virginia colony in Virginia Beach still extant include the Broad Bay Manor, Francis Land House, Lynnhaven House, Pembroke Manor, Thoroughgood House, and Upper Wolfsnare.

Before the construction of this structure, in the early 1600’s, settlers required passage between the Lynnhaven River and the Chesapeake Bay. Adam Keeling and his fellows at Ye Dudlies plantation organized a plan; they dug a trench into the sandbar at the mouth of the Lynnhaven River that could barely fit a canoe. Almost immediately after the trench was finished, a storm surge caused unusually high tides in the bay to rush into the river, widening the small trench into what is now the Lynnhaven Inlet. In one fell swoop, Adam Keeling changed the landscape of the Virginia coastline and created new opportunities for travel, trade, and fishing in the area.

== Gallery ==
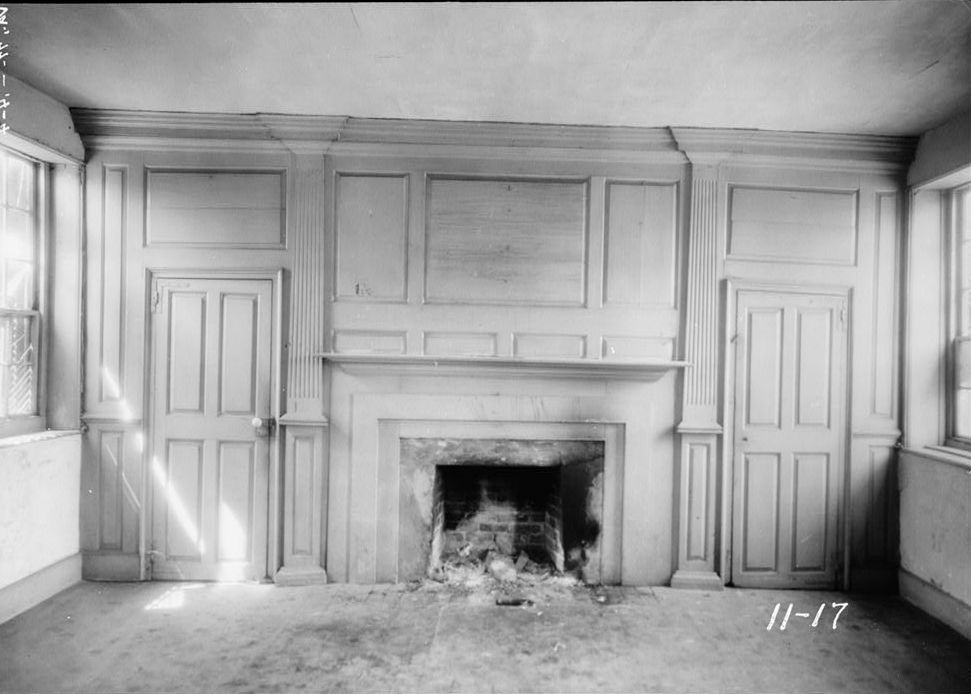
View of Interior Paneling, c. 1937, Historic American Buildings Survey

== See also ==
- History of Virginia Beach
- List of the oldest buildings in Virginia
- National Register of Historic Places listings in Virginia Beach, Virginia
