= Oceana, Virginia =

Unincorporated community in Virginia, USA

Oceana
- Unincorporated community
- Location within the state of Virginia Oceana (the United States)
- Coordinates: 36°50′32″N 76°0′47″W
- Country: United States
- State: Virginia
- Time zone: UTC−6 (Eastern (EST))
  - Summer (DST): UTC−5 (CDT)

Oceana is a major unincorporated community within Virginia Beach, Virginia, United States. Adjacent to Oceana is the Naval Air Station Oceana. The community is centered at the intersection of Virginia Beach Boulevard and First Colonial Road. Oceana is also located close to the Atlantic Park and Seatack neighborhoods of Virginia Beach. The community developed from Oceana Neighborhood Historic District, which started in 1883 around a newly built railroad depot.
