= Woodhouse House =

Woodhouse House may refer to:

- John T. Woodhouse House, Grosse Pointe Farms, MI, listed on the NRHP in Michigan
- Woodhouse House (Victoria, Texas), listed on the NRHP in Texas
- Woodhouse House (Virginia Beach, Virginia), listed on the NRHP in Virginia
