= VB Wave =

Bus rapid transit line in Virginia Beach

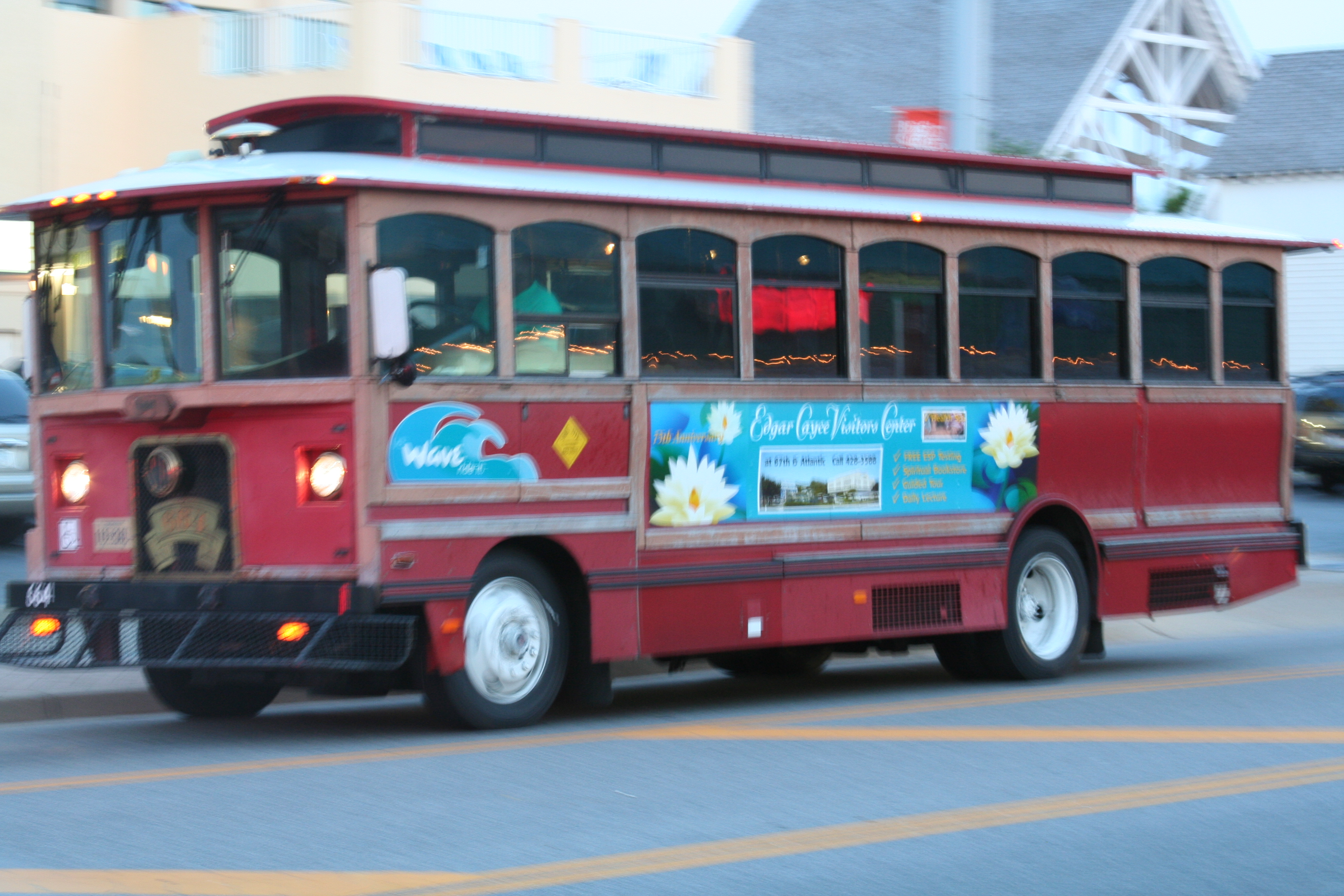
- A red trolley formerly used on the VB Wave

Overview
- System: Hampton Roads Transit
- Vehicles: 14 tourist trolleys
- Status: Open
- Began service: 1980

Routes
- Routes: 3
- Locale: Virginia Beach, Virginia

Service
- Frequency: 15, 20, and 30 minutes
- Ridership: 175,457 (2023)

The VB Wave is a tourist trolley circulator bus line in Virginia Beach, Virginia. The system contains three of the Hampton Roads Transit bus lines that link the beachfront to other attractions in inner Virginia Beach. The VB Wave has its own right-of-way, off-bus fare collection, streetcar-inspired design, and more frequent services. The service runs seasonally, starting in May and ending on Labor Day or Neptune Festival. Hampton Roads Transit route 20 connects the system with downtown Norfolk, Virginia.

== History ==
The service was started in 1980 and originally only had four trolleys running along Atlantic Avenue. Three more trolleys were added to the fleet in 1981. The system was sold to Tidewater Regional Transit, the predecessor to Hampton Roads Transit, in 1984. The trolley style buses were replaced with regular hybrid buses between 2008 and 2015, but due to declining ridership new trolleys were brought back. Service was temporarily suspended in 2020 due to the COVID-19 pandemic.

== Fleet ==
The bus fleet consists of fourteen blue tourist trolley style buses. They were manufactured by Hometown Trolley, a trolley-style bus manufacturer based in Wisconsin. The buses are 34 feet long, have bike racks, and can fit around 28 passengers. The original fleet of buses were inspired by the San Francisco trolley cars and were originally painted red, but the new fleet is painted blue. The buses were restored before the opening of the 2024 season.

== Routes ==
As of 2024, the VB Wave only operates on routes three routes - 30, 31, and 35. Route 34 was discontinued due to low ridership, but route 35 now covers portions of it. Route 35 is the longest route. Route 30 is the most used route on the system, with 121,000 rides in 2023.

=== Current routes ===
- Route 30: Atlantic Avenue Trolley, 15 minute frequency
- Route 31: Aquarium and Campground Trolley, 20 minute frequency
- Route 35: Bayfront Trolley, 30 minute frequency

=== Discontinued routes ===
- Route 32: Shoppers Shuttle (or Blue Line)
- Route 34: Oceanfront Connector, 15 minute frequency

== Ridership ==
- 1983: 450,000
- 2006: 410,000
- 2007: 400,000
- 2013: 315,000
- 2022: 132,000
- 2023: 175,457

== See also ==
- GRTC Pulse, a bus rapid transit system in Richmond, Virginia
- Metroway, a bus rapid transit system in Arlington and Alexandria, Virginia
