= U.S. Coast Guard Station =

U.S. Coast Guard Station may refer to:

- U.S. Coast Guard Station (Brigantine City, New Jersey), formerly listed on the National Register of Historic Places in Atlantic County, New Jersey
- U.S. Coast Guard Station (Virginia Beach, Virginia), listed on the National Register of Historic Places in Virginia Beach, Virginia
