= The Hermitage (Virginia Beach, Virginia) =

Historic house in Virginia, United States

- U.S. National Register of Historic Places
- Virginia Landmarks Register
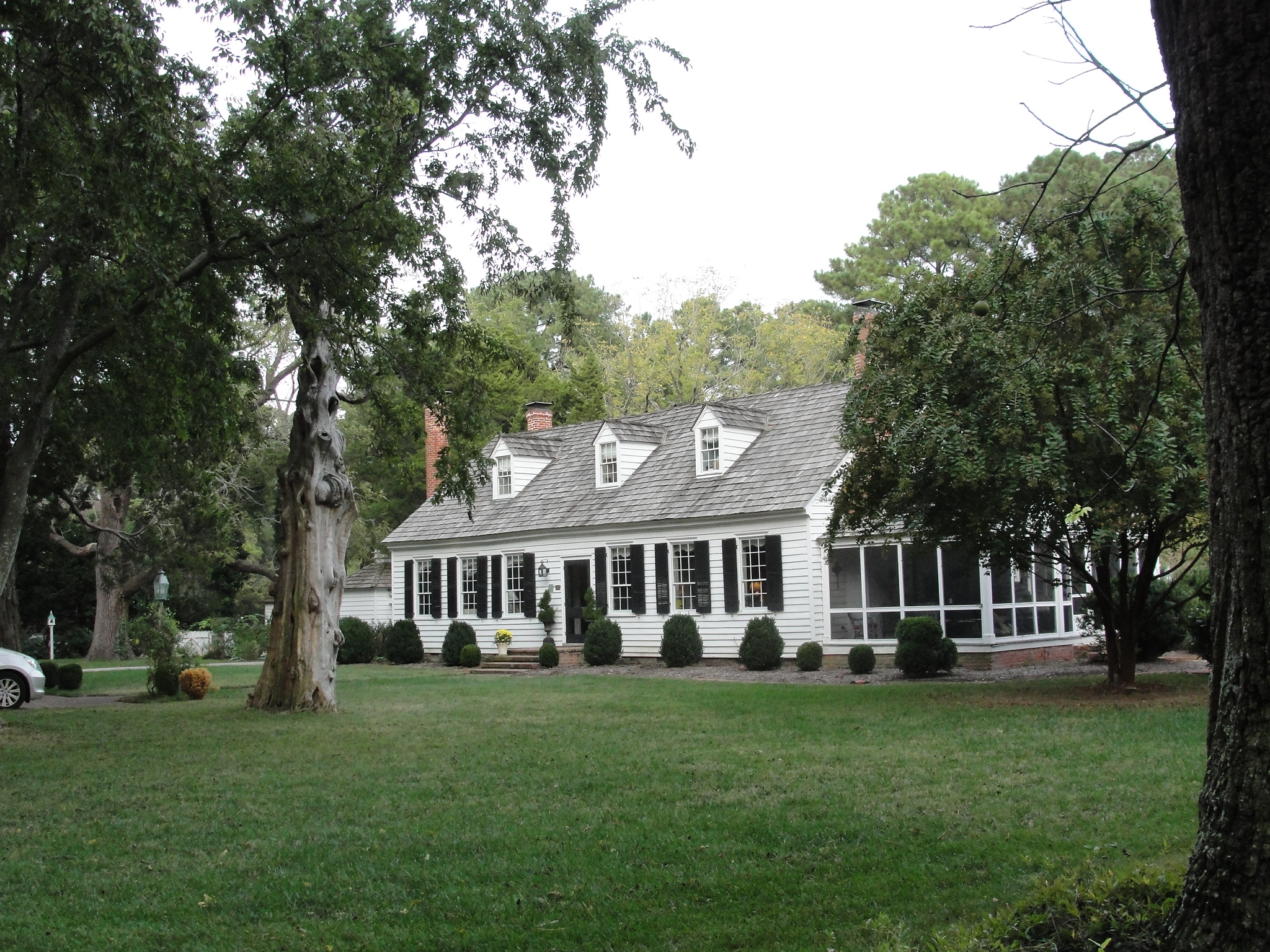
- The Hermitage, September 2012

- Location within Virginia Location within the United States
- Location: 4200 Hermitage, Virginia Beach, Virginia
- Nearest city: Virginia Beach, Virginia
- Coordinates: 36°53′20″N 76°07′13″W
- Area: 1.6 acres (0.65 ha)
- Built: c. 1700, c. 1820, 1940
- Architectural style: Colonial, postmedieval English
- NRHP reference No.: 08000079
- VLR No.: 134-0016

Significant dates
- 1800
- Added to NRHP: February 14, 2008
- Designated VLR: December 5, 2007

The Hermitage, also known as Devereaux House, is a historic home located at Virginia Beach, Virginia. The original section was built about 1700, with two later additions. It is a 1 1/2-story, four-bay, Colonial era frame dwelling. The second portion was constructed by about 1820, doubling the size of the dwelling, and the final portion was added in 1940. Also on the property are three outbuildings, as well as a large subterranean brick cistern, now part of the basement to the house.

It was added to the National Register of Historic Places in 2008.

== Description ==
Located across the inlet from the Thoroughgood House, the Hermitage is a one-and-a-half story farm house constructed in 3 separate periods. The first elements of the first portion can be dated to approximately 1699 as a part of Adam Thoroughgood's "Grand Patent." From then, construction halted on the land until ca. 1820 when the size of the house doubled. Finally, in 1940, the final portion was added, including a kitchen and plumbing.

On the property, there were three outbuildings including a large underground cistern which now serve as a basement. Frazier Associates completed these outbuildings in 1992 which are the only antebellum outbuildings surviving in Virginia Beach. The property was a farm up until the mid-1950s when it's property served as a base for the urban development of the neighborhood of Thoroughgood and is one of the few examples of colonial architecture in Virginia Beach.

=== Site ===
The Hermitage, located about 50 yards from the northeastern end of Thoroughgood Cove, is a single dwelling accompanied by three outbuildings that was sold by a James Collier in 1954 along with Thoroughgood and Bayville farms to develop the neighborhood of Thoroughgood, the first development in Virginia Beach.

The Hermitage's original property used to extend one-and-a-half miles west to Pleasure House Road until the development of the property. The road that connected The Hermitage to Pleasure House Road was lined with lilacs and cedar trees. Today, there is evidence of this with the high number of cedar trees in the neighborhood of Thoroughgood. On the property, there are large numbers of walnut and cedar trees as well as a great dogwood tree.
