= First Landing State Park =

State park in Virginia, USA

- IUCN category III (natural monument or feature)
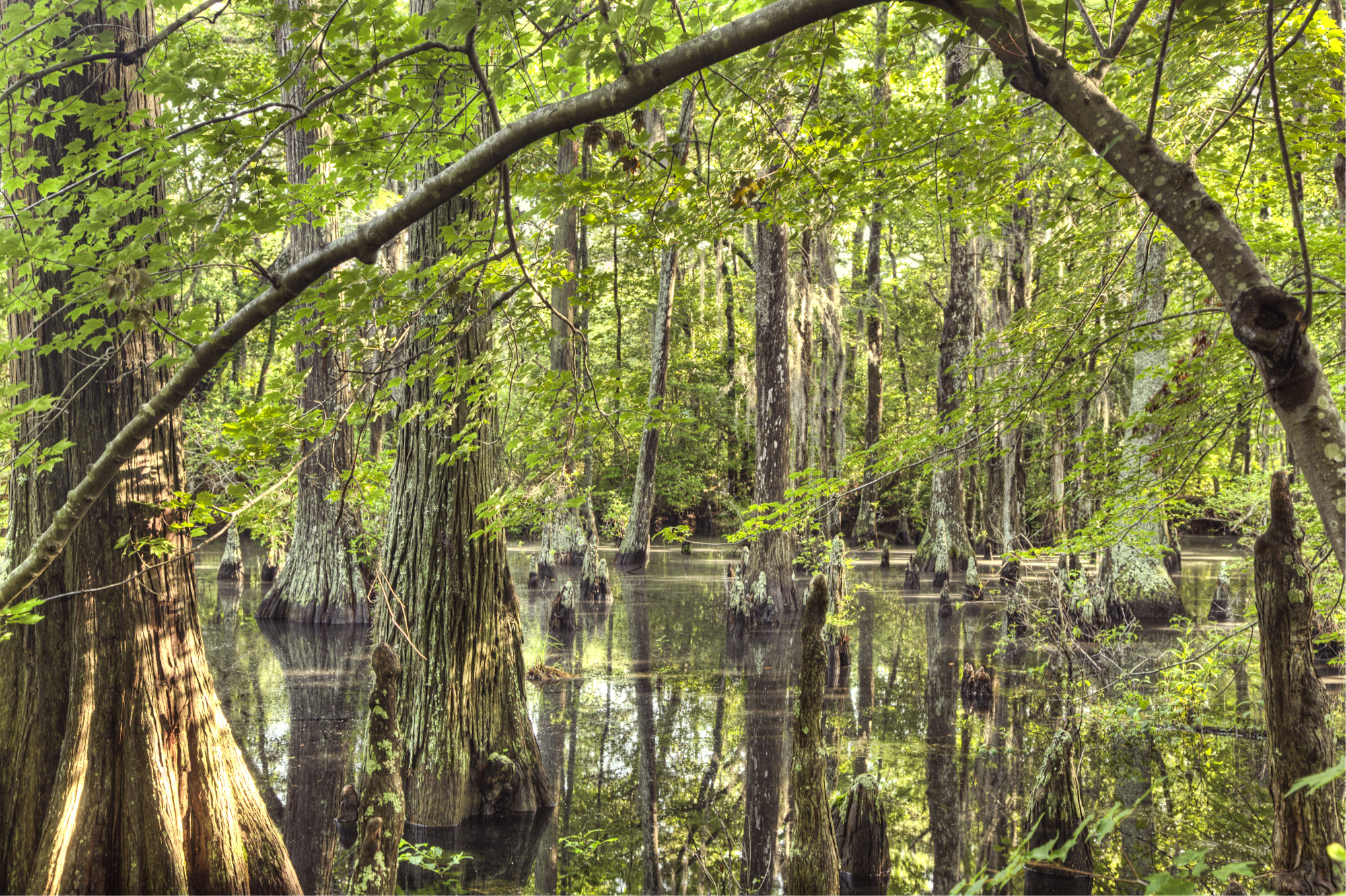
- Cypress swamp at First Landing State Park

- Location within Virginia Location within the United States
- Location: Virginia Beach, Virginia, USA
- Coordinates: 36°54′22″N 76°0′55″W
- Area: 2,888 acres (11.69 km^{2})
- Established: 1936
- Visitors: 1,000,000+ (in 2004)
- Governing body: Virginia Department of Conservation and Recreation

First Landing State Park (formerly Seashore State Park) offers recreational opportunities at Cape Henry in the independent city of Virginia Beach, Virginia. As the first planned state park of Virginia, First Landing is listed on the National Register of Historic Places as Seashore State Park Historic District. A portion of the park is listed as a National Natural Landmark as part of the Seashore Natural Area.

The state park is near the site of the first landing on April 26, 1607 of Christopher Newport and the Virginia Company colonists before establishing themselves at Jamestown. The park includes cabins, areas for camping, fishing, and swimming, a public beach, and over 19 miles (31 km) of trails for hiking and biking. Virginia's most popular state park, it's visited by over a million people each year. Its main entrance is located on Shore Drive across from the beach camping entrance. First Landing State Park charges a fee for its camping facilities and for the overnight use of its cabins.

Originally built by the Civilian Conservation Corps in the 1930s, First Landing State Park is located on the Chesapeake Bay. First Landing offers boating, swimming, nature and history programs, hiking, biking, picnicking, a boat launch, cabins and 19 miles (31 km) of trails on 2,888 acres (11.69 km^{2}). It also has campsites that have water and electric hook-ups and nearby access to restrooms and showers. The park's name was changed in 1997 from Seashore State Park to First Landing State Park to reflect its heritage as the first place where members of the Virginia Company landed (though its former name is still commonly used by Tidewater locals).

== History ==
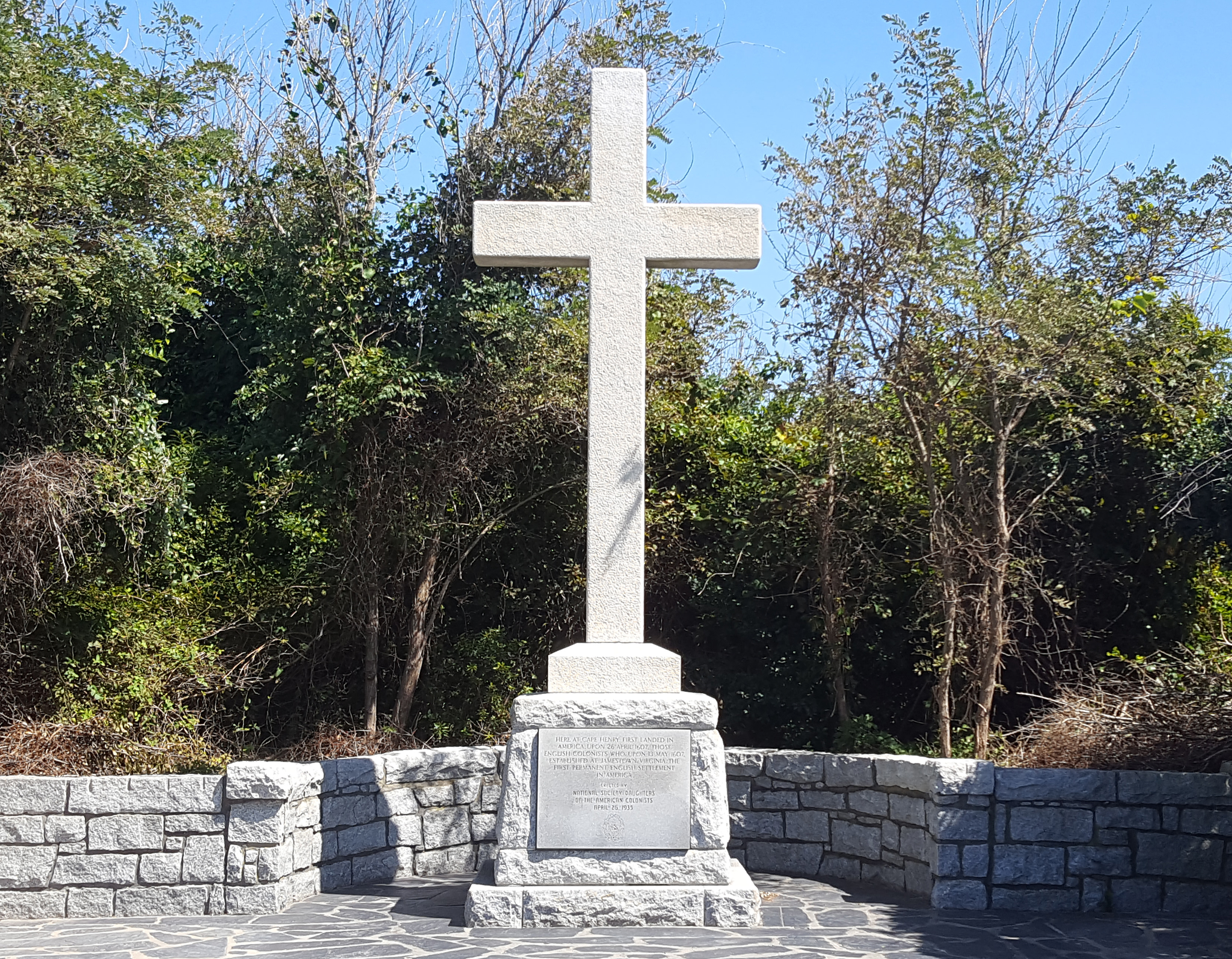
First Landing cross

Development of the Seashore State Park began in 1933 by the Civilian Conservation Corps on 1,060 acres (4.3 km^{2}) of donated land. Most of the workers were Black American men. The new park opened on June 15, 1936. Several additions of land and adjustments of the border with Joint Expeditionary Base East resulted in the current total area of the park of 2,888 acres (11.69 km^{2}).

The 3,598-acre (14.56 km^{2}) Seashore Natural Area, a portion of which is located within the park, was listed as a National Natural Landmark in 1965. The designation recognized the significance of the park's forested dunes and semitropical vegetation. In 1997, the park's name was changed from Seashore State Park to First Landing State Park to reflect its heritage as the first place where members of the Virginia Company landed.

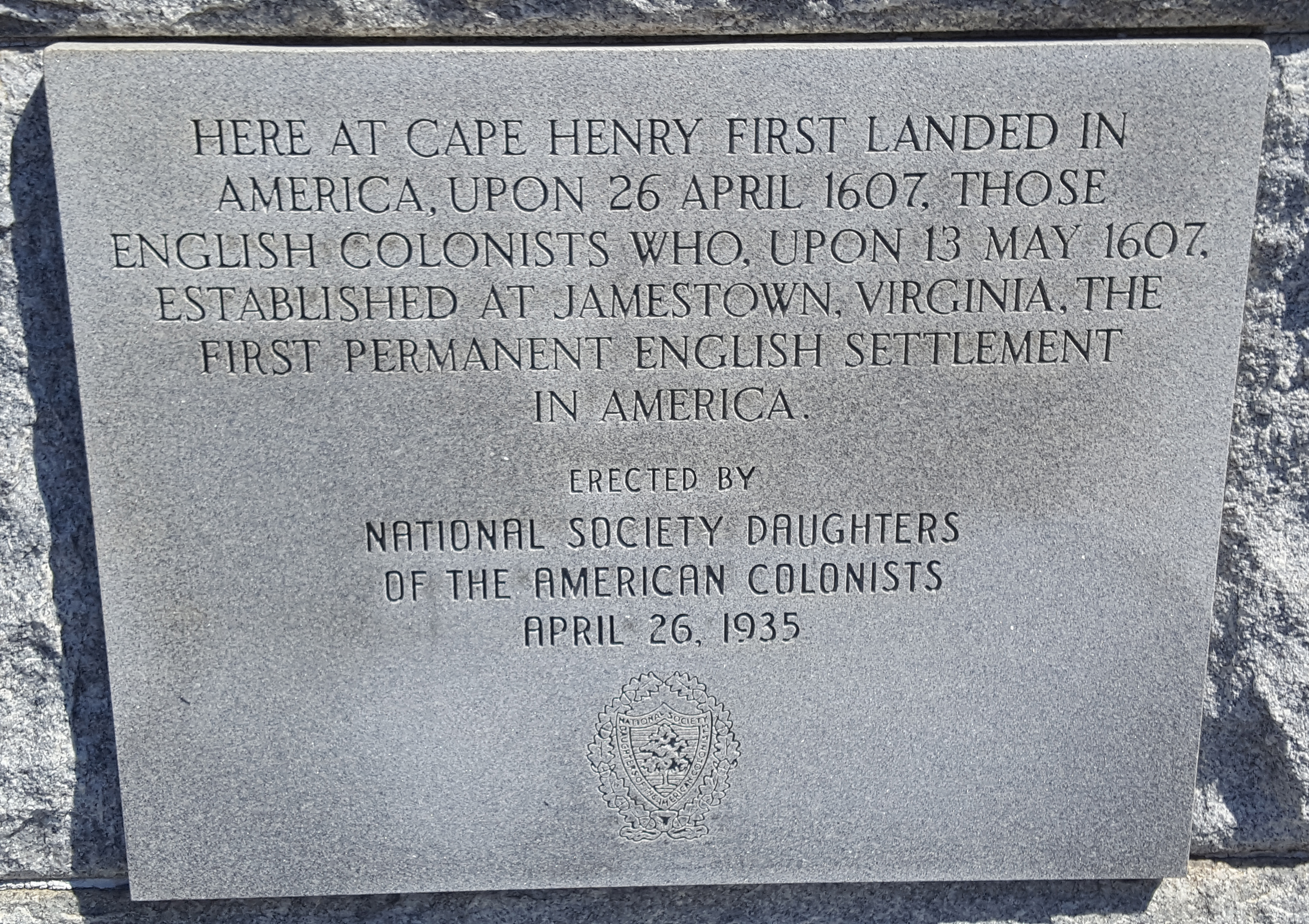
First Landing cross placard

A cross was erected in the state park by the Daughters of the American Colonists on April 26, 1935 to mark the location of the first landing by English colonists at the site, along with a placard at the base of the cross with the dates of the landing and the settlement at Jamestown, Virginia.

Like all Virginia State Parks following Reconstruction and through the first half of the 1900's, First Landing State Park implemented Jim Crow laws with segregated and unequal facilities for white and black visitors. In 1955, following the Brown vs. Board of Education Supreme Court decision, the governing authorities of First Landing State park chose to close the park rather than integrate, reopening an integrated park in 1965 following the 1964 Civil Rights Act.

== Historic district ==
- Seashore State Park Historic District
- U.S. National Register of Historic Places
- U.S. Historic district
- Virginia Landmarks Register
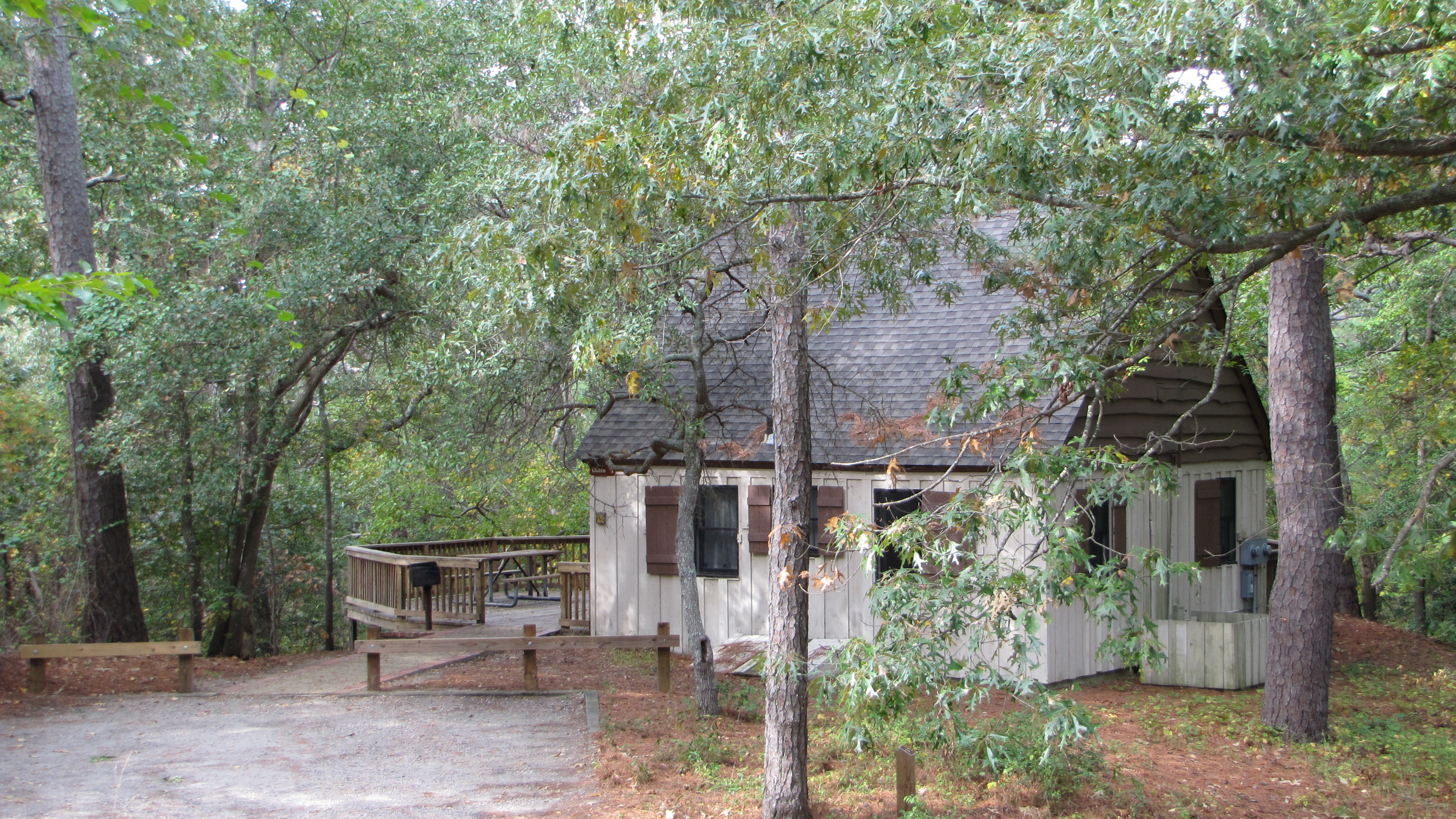
- A cabin in the park
- Location: 2500 Shore Dr., Virginia Beach, Virginia
- Area: 2,889 acres (11.69 km^{2})
- Built: 1933
- Built by: CEGG Assoc. LC; NPS, et al.
- Architectural style: Modern Movement
- NRHP reference No.: 05001267
- VLR No.: 134-0099

Significant dates
- Added to NRHP: November 16, 2005
- Designated VLR: June 1, 2005

The Seashore State Park Historic District is a 2,889-acre (11.69 km^{2}) historic district (comprising the entire park) with significance dating to 1933 for its architecture/engineering. It includes work by CEGG Assoc. LC, the National Park Service, and others. It includes eight contributing buildings, six contributing sites and 10 contributing structures.

The park was the first planned state park of the Virginia State Park system. Its plan was designed and developed with extensive consultation of the National Park Service, which provided architectural drawings and plans, and which educated about traffic circulation and other aspects of already-designed U.S. national parks. The work of actually building roads and buildings and other structures and features of the park was accomplished by Civilian Conservation Corps workers, who were housed in three camps of 200 men each.

== See also ==
- List of National Natural Landmarks in Virginia
- National Register of Historic Places listings in Virginia Beach, Virginia
- List of Virginia State Parks
