= Woodhouse House (Virginia Beach, Virginia) =

Historic house in Virginia, United States

- U.S. National Register of Historic Places
- Virginia Landmarks Register
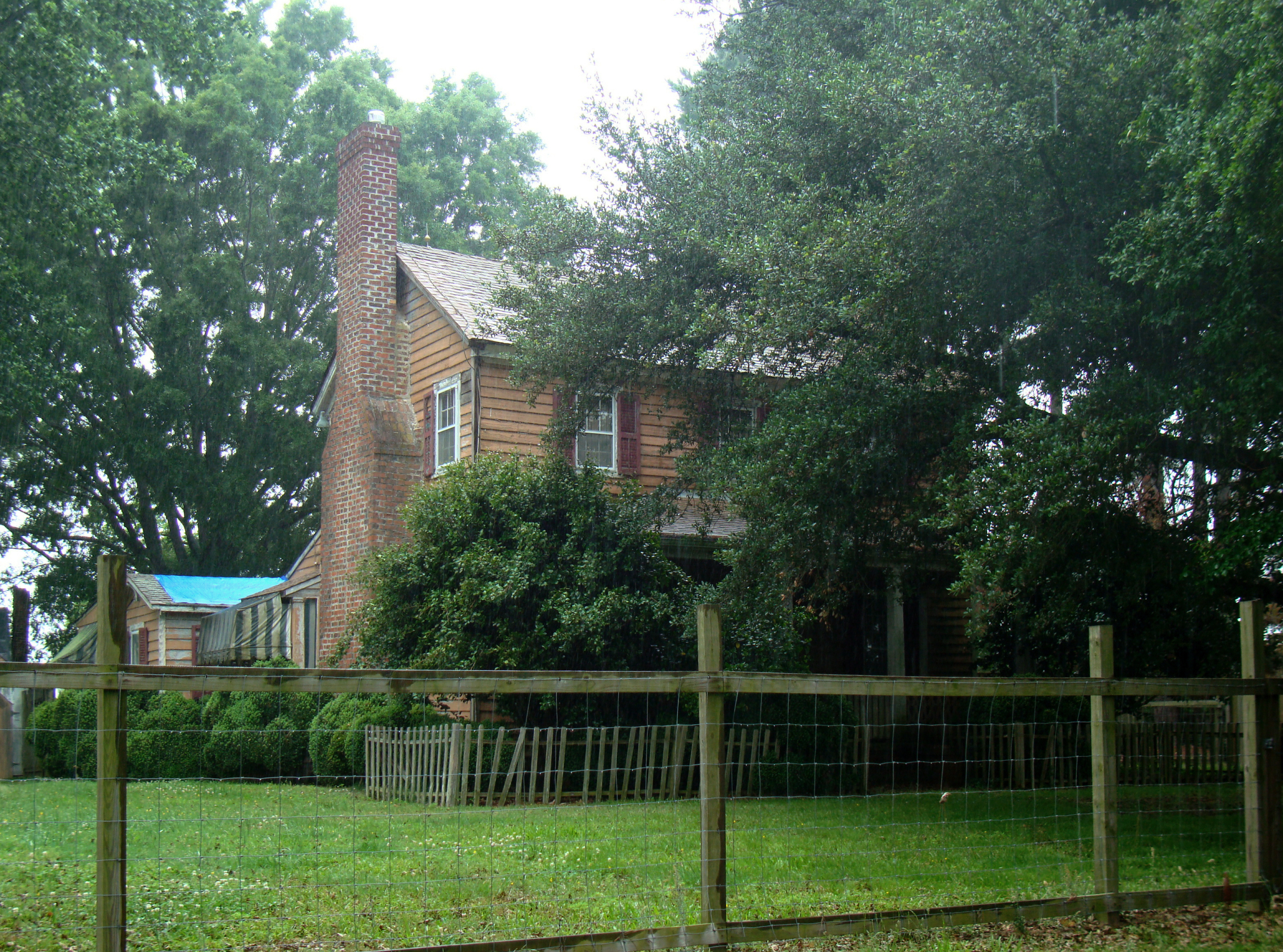
- Front of Woodhouse House in May 2012

- Location within Virginia
- Location: 3067 W. Neck Rd., Virginia Beach, Virginia
- Coordinates: 36°43′49″N 76°3′4″W
- Area: 3 acres (1.2 ha)
- Built: 1810
- Architect: Woodhouse, Capt. Thomas
- Architectural style: Federal
- NRHP reference No.: 07000372
- VLR No.: 134-0058

Significant dates
- Added to NRHP: April 24, 2007
- Designated VLR: December 6, 2006

Woodhouse House in Virginia Beach, Virginia, also known as Fountain House or Simmons House, was built in 1810 in the Federal architecture style. It was listed on the National Register of Historic Places in 2007. It is located south of the Virginia Beach Courthouse complex, still surrounded by farm land but facing increasing encroachment by suburban homes.

The house is a wood frame two-story structure with a brick American bond chimney with Flemish bond headers and asphalt shingles. The kitchen and smokehouse were built in 1904. Also on the property are a "mid-20th century garage, shed, well, and barn, and late 20th century swimming pool." Woodhouse and Simmons family cemeteries are also on the property. The Woodhouse cemetery, where Thomas is buried, is near a dilapidated barn. The Simmons cemetery is detached from the main structures and is at the northeast corner of the property.

The property was originally 75 acres (30 ha) in size, which Captain Thomas Woodhouse bought from John Frizzell in 1811. Woodhouse died in 1813 at age 39 and willed the property to his brother, Henry Woodhouse. Henry sold the property, now 102 acres (41 ha) in size, to Andrew Simmons in 1849. Simmons, who increased the acreage to 267 acres (108 ha), died in the 1880s and his descendants sold the property to William D. Woodhouse, a descendant of Capt. Thomas Woodhouse. In 1889 William sold the land to Reuben Fountain, who lived on adjoining land. The Fountain family still owns the property. Suburban encroachment has diminished the total acreage to just slightly over 50 acres (20 ha), with the home and outlying buildings occupying 1 acre (0.40 ha). The home is one of the few buildings of its type in Virginia Beach, representing the transition from Colonial and Georgian architecture to Federal style in the region.

== See also ==
- National Register of Historic Places listings in Virginia Beach, Virginia
