= Briarwood Elementary School =

Briarwood Elementary School may refer to:

- Briarwood Christian School in Birmingham, Alabama, which includes elementary grades
- Briarwood Elementary School (Prairie Village, Kansas), in the Shawnee Mission School District
- Briarwood Elementary School (Bowling Green, Kentucky), in Warren County, Kentucky
- Briarwood Elementary School (Florham Park, New Jersey), in Florham Park School District
- Briarwood Elementary School (Issaquah, Washington)
- Briarwood Elementary School (Moore, Oklahoma), in Moore Public Schools District
