= Lincoln College of New England =

For-profit college in Connecticut, United States

Coordinates: 41.6328°N 72.9211°W

- Type: Private college
- Active: 1966–2018
- Location: Southington, Connecticut, U.S.
- Campus: Urban, suburban, and rural
- Colors: Royal Blue; Gold
- Mascot: Wildcats
- Website: www.lincolncollegene.edu

Lincoln College of New England was a private college in Southington, Connecticut, United States. It was founded in 1966 as Briarwood College. Its accreditor placed the college on probation in the summer of 2018; the institution subsequently stopped admitting students and announced that it would close in December.

The college offered 24 degree programs, including legal assisting, medical assisting, and clinical assisting.
