= Mount Trashmore Park =

Park in Virginia Beach, Virginia

Coordinates: 36.8310°N 76.1232°W

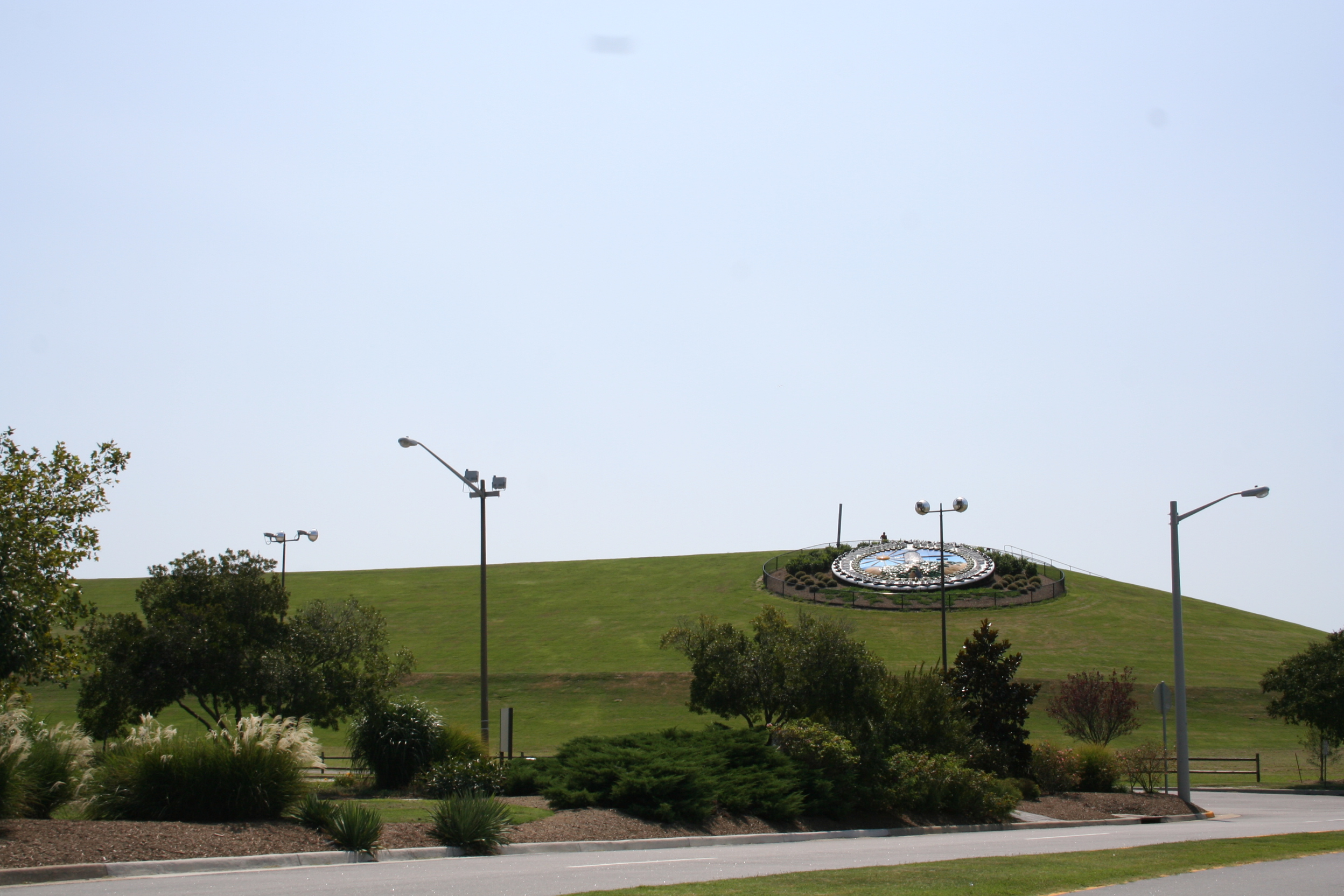
The seal of the City of Virginia Beach, visible on the side of Mount Trashmore

Mount Trashmore Park, also known simply as Mount Trashmore, is a city park located in Virginia Beach, Virginia, which opened in 1974, Mount Trashmore is an example of landfill reuse, as its creation consisted of the conversion of an abandoned landfill into a park. The park spans 165 acres (67 ha) with hills larger than 60 feet (18 m) high and 800 feet (240 m) long. Facilities include three large, two medium, and six small picnic shelters, playground areas, four volleyball areas, parking, vending machines and restrooms. Mount Trashmore Park also has multiple walking trails: a Perimeter Trail that measures 1.95 miles (3.14 km), a Lake Trail that measures 1.45 miles (2.33 km), and a Mountain Trail that measures 1.30 miles (2.09 km). The Lake Trail and the Hill Trail may be combined for a trail measuring 2.75 miles (4.43 km). The park also features two lakes where fishing is permitted. Since its opening in the 1970s, it ranks as the most popular park in Virginia Beach, with more than a million visitors a year.

The park is open seven days a week from 7:30 a.m. until sunset.

== Kids' Cove ==
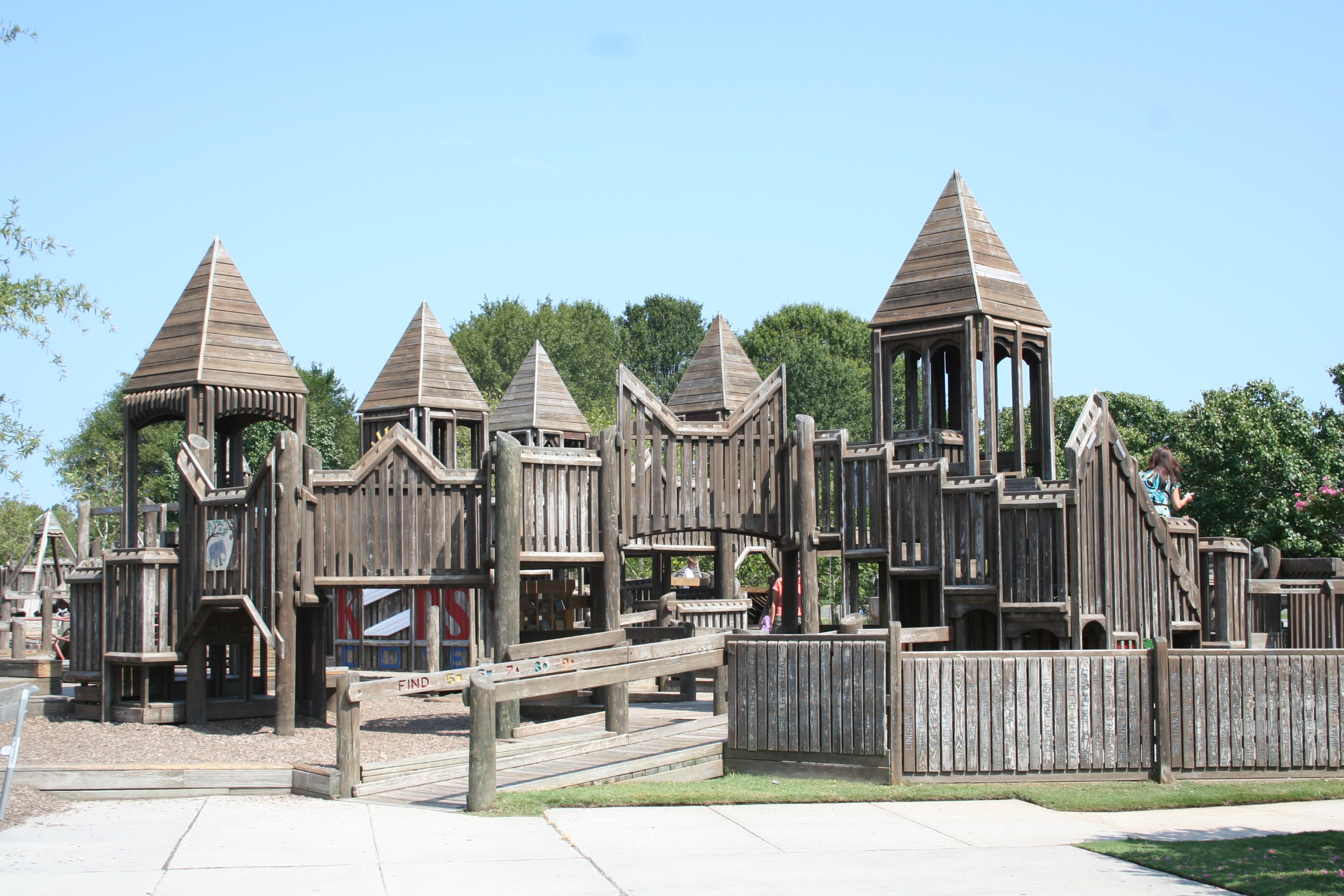
"Kids' Cove" playground at Mount Trashmore Park

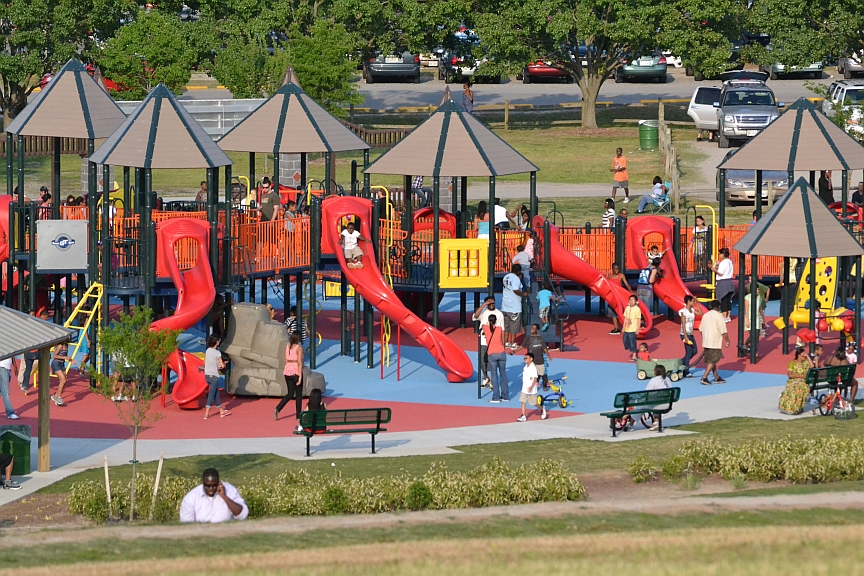
The updated Kids' Cove playground that opened in 2010

Kids' Cove, an innovative playground designed for children using children's ideas and input, is also located at Mount Trashmore Park, and opened in 1993. The playground is wheelchair-accessible and it was constructed totally by volunteers and coordinated by the Virginia Beach Jr. Woman's Club.

A $1.4 million Kids' Cove reopened to the public in December 2010. The playground was nearly twice the size of its predecessor.

In 2023 the City of Virginia Beach announced a $1.6 million renovation of the playground, including a 3,200-square-foot extension of the park's amenities. The new area will be fully compliant with ADA guidelines, and will feature new hillside slides and concrete stairs closer to the playground, replacing the original "Helping Hands" mural on the old timber staircases. Construction began in 2024 with the city saying that it would be finished by late summer of the same year. The renovated playground opened in July 2025.

== Skate Park ==
Mount Trashmore Skate Park is located in the northeast corner of the park, where numerous professional skateboarders have made appearances, including Tony Hawk. The 24,000-square-foot (2,200 m^{2}) skate park opened in August 2003 features an extensive street course including an above-ground, 7-foot-deep (2.1 m) bowl. The park also has a competition-sized vert ramp over 13 feet (4.0 m) tall and 40 feet (12 m) wide. On August 16, 2006, a fire damaged a significant portion of the skate park. The skate park was completely rebuilt as of March 2007.
