= Bayville Farm =

Historic house in Virginia, United States

- Formerly listed on the U.S. National Register of Historic Places
- Virginia Landmarks Register
- Location: Off VA 650, Virginia Beach, Virginia
- Area: 4.5 acres (1.8 ha)
- Built: 1827
- Built by: Hunter, Jacob
- NRHP reference No.: 80004317
- VLR No.: 134-0002

Significant dates
- Added to NRHP: May 19, 1980
- Designated VLR: June 17, 1975
- Removed from NRHP: June 4, 2008
- Delisted VLR: June 19, 2008

Bayville Farm, also known as Church Point Plantation and Bayside Plantation, was a historic plantation house in Virginia Beach, Virginia.

The house was built in 1827 and enlarged in the 1840s, and was a two-story, five-bay, two-story, double-pile, frame structure with brick ends. It had a basement laid in three-course American bond, a pedimented tetra-style Roman Doric order porch at each entrance and four interior end chimneys. It was destroyed by fire in 2007.

It was added to the National Register of Historic Places in 1980, and delisted in 2008.
