= Oceana Neighborhood Historic District =

Historic district in Virginia, United States

- U.S. National Register of Historic Places
- U.S. Historic district
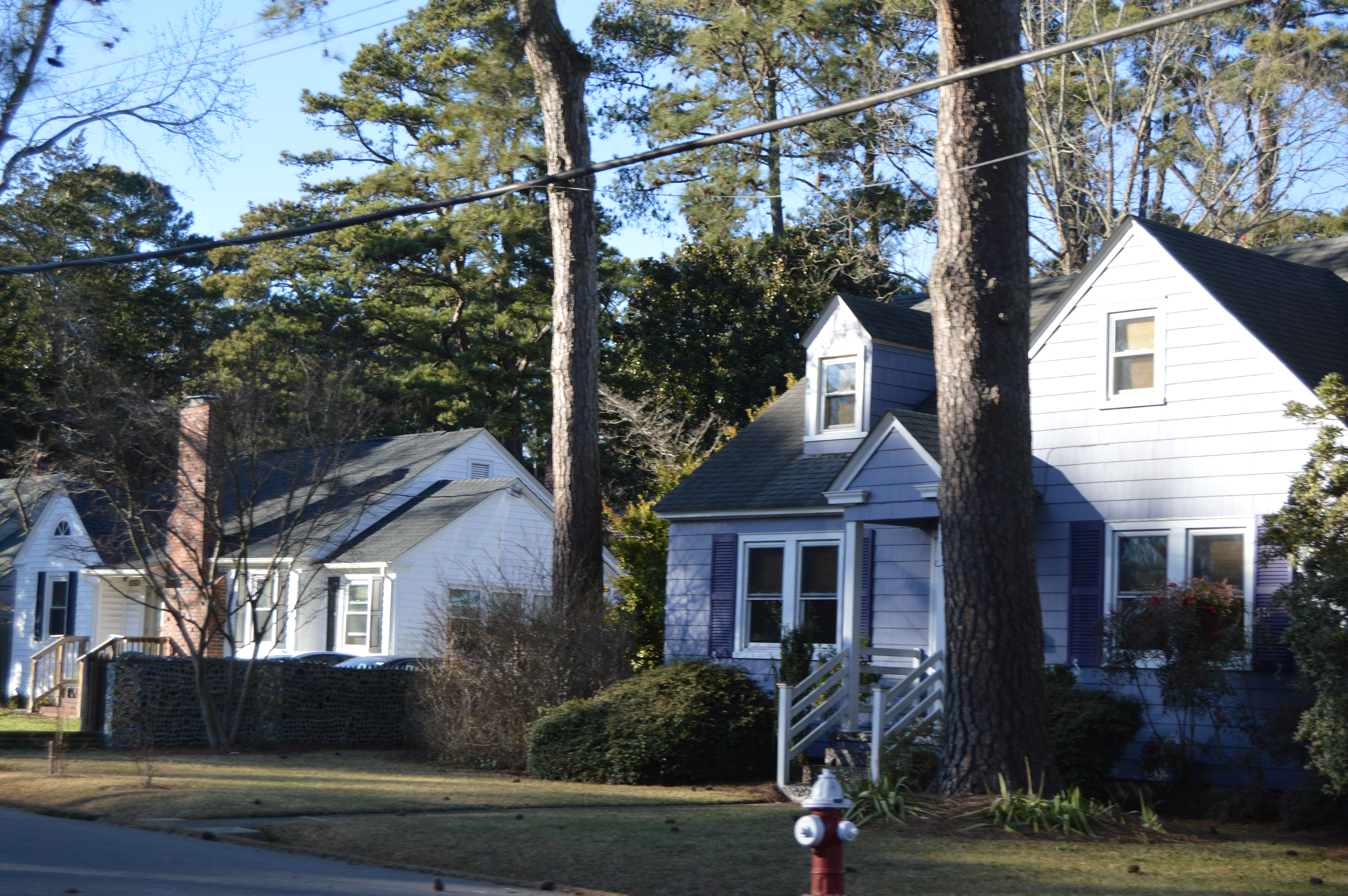
- Houses on Michigan Avenue

- Location within Virginia Location within the United States
- Location: Indiana, Louisa, Michigan, New York, & Ohio Aves., Middle, Roselynn & West Lns., Oceana, Southern & Virginia Beach Blvd, Virginia Beach, Virginia
- Coordinates: 36°50′28″N 76°00′54″W
- Area: 70 acres (28 ha)
- Built: 1906
- NRHP reference No.: 100001645
- Added to NRHP: September 18, 2017

The Oceana Neighborhood Historic District encompasses an early 20th-century planned neighborhood subdivision in Virginia Beach, Virginia. It consists of 70 acres (28 ha), roughly bounded by Virginia Beach Boulevard, First Colonial Road, and North Oceana Boulevard. This area was platted out in 1906 with a rectilinear street grid, and saw development of its commercial corridors in the 1930s. It contains a diversity of period residential architecture, including many examples of Colonial Revival architecture, as well as a number of older houses that predate the subdivision.

The district was listed on the National Register of Historic Places in 2017.

== See also ==
- National Register of Historic Places listings in Virginia Beach, Virginia
