= Briarwood (Little Rock) =

Neighborhood in Little Rock, Arkansas, United States

Coordinates: 34°44′55″N 92°21′16″W

Briarwood is a neighborhood in central Little Rock, Arkansas. The neighborhood includes a number of subdivisions developed during the 1950s and early 1960s. Its boundaries are West Markham Street to the north, Interstate 630 to the south, University Avenue to the east and Cunningham Lake Road to the west.

More information can be found at the neighborhood association web page.

Commercial redevelopment has started in the neighborhood. On the east side, the University Mall (built as an enclosed mall in 1967) was demolished in the spring of 2008 and the site was scheduled to be redeveloped and opened as the [./Https://shopparkavenue.com/#contact Park Avenue lifestyle center] in October, 2009. On October 10, 2010, Target became the first tenet in Park Avenue Shopping Center.[4] (https://www.arkansasonline.com/news/2010/jul/20/new-life-midtown/) However, residential redevelopment continues. Many Briarwood homes have been recently updated with double-glazed windows and up-to-date baths and kitchens.
