= Upper Wolfsnare =

Historic house in Virginia, United States

- U.S. National Register of Historic Places
- Virginia Landmarks Register
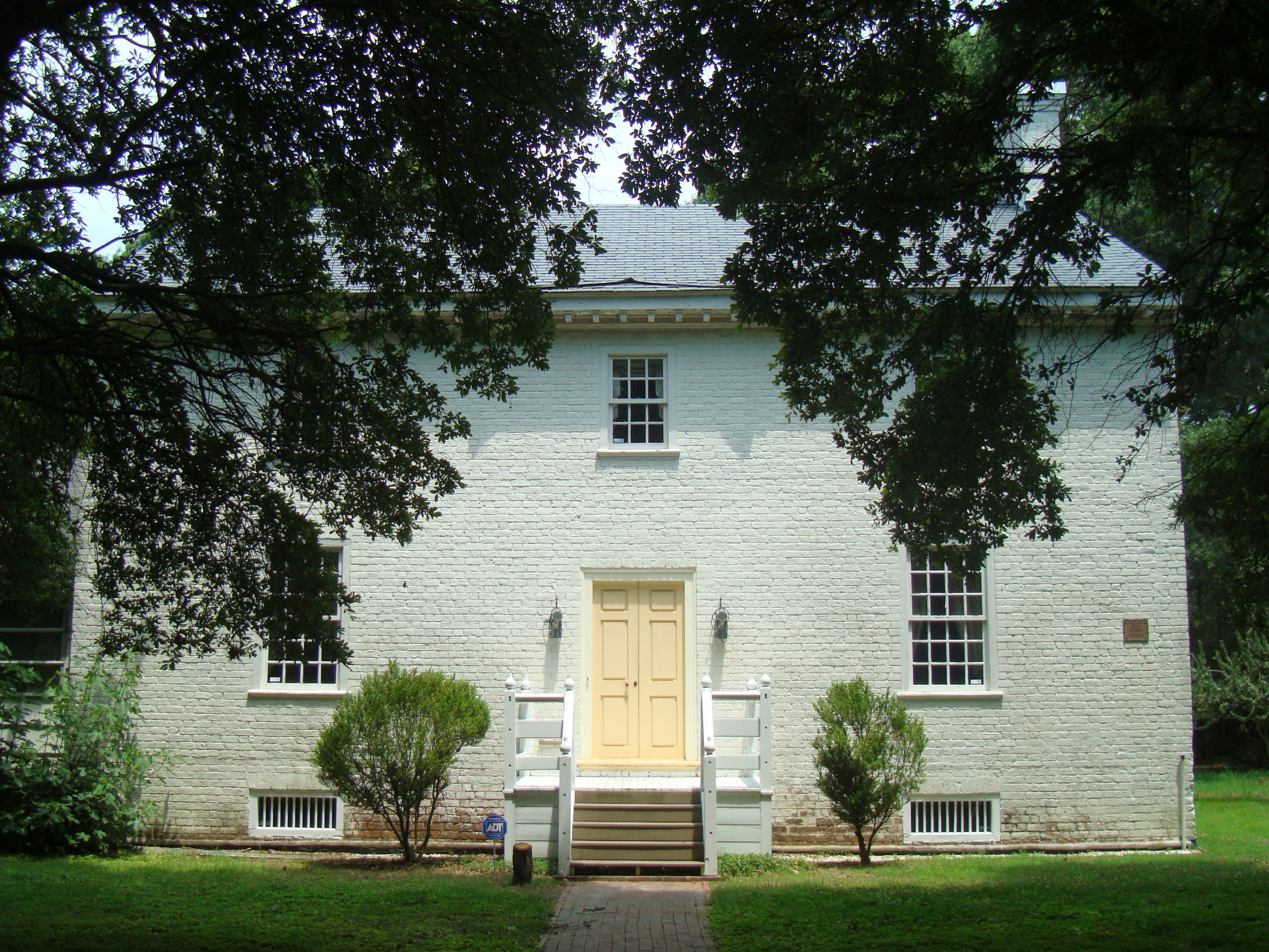
- Upper Wolfsnare home on July 4, 2012

- Location within Virginia Location within the United States
- Location: 2040 Potter's Road, E of jct. of Rtes. 635 and 632, Virginia Beach, Virginia
- Coordinates: 36°50′26″N 76°2′21″W
- Area: 3 acres (1.2 ha)
- Built: 1759
- NRHP reference No.: 75002119
- VLR No.: 134-0034

Significant dates
- Added to NRHP: March 26, 1975
- Designated VLR: November 19, 1974

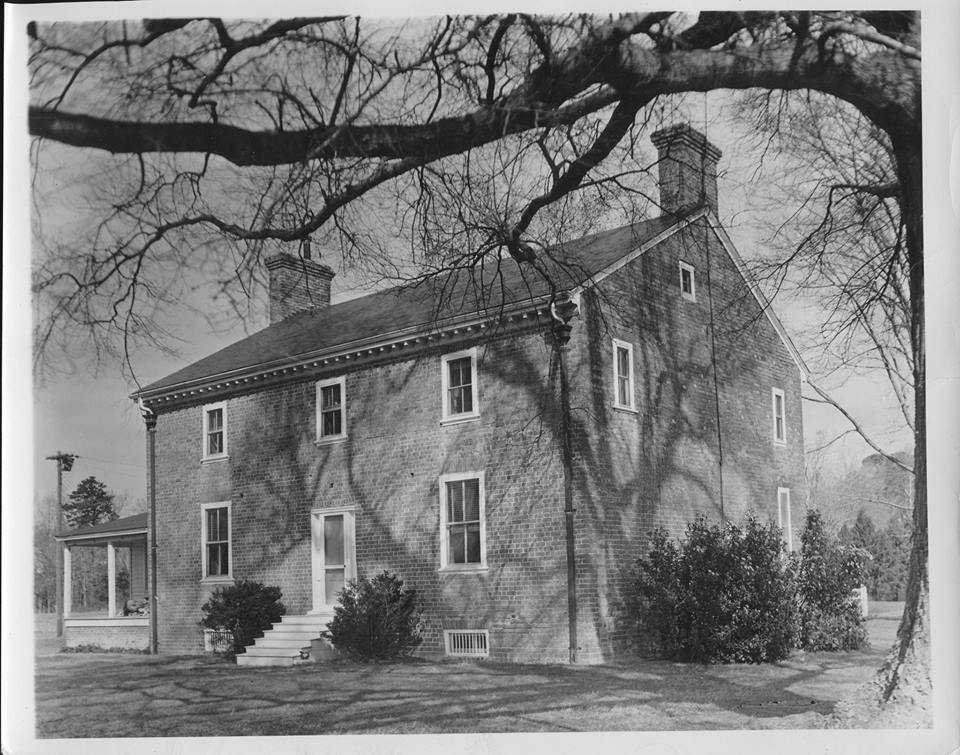

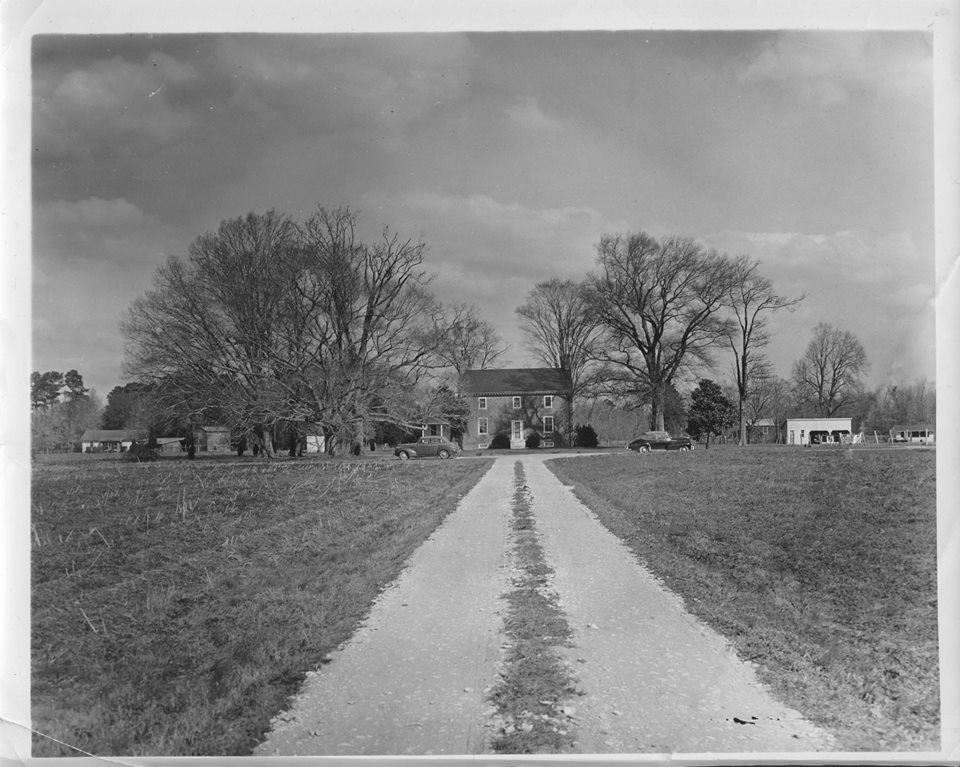

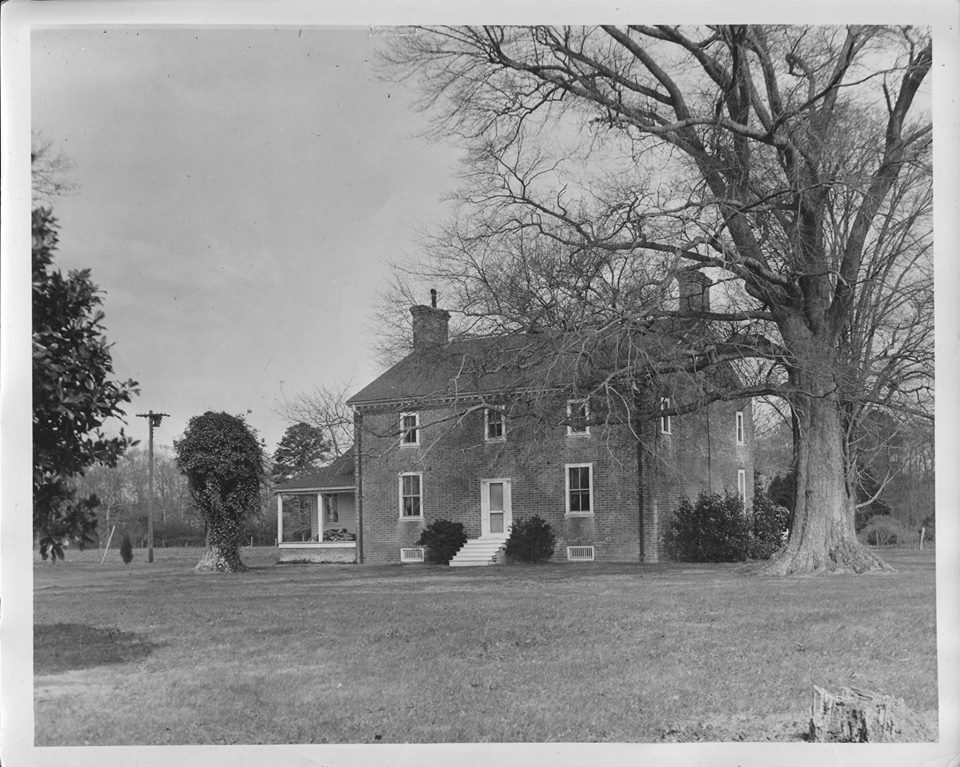

Upper Wolfsnare, historically called Brick House Farm until 1939, is a colonial-era brick home built, probably about 1759, in Georgian style by Thomas Walke III in Virginia Beach, Virginia.

== History ==
Thomas III was a major in the British Army. His son, Thomas Walke IV, was a member of the Virginia Ratifying Convention of 1788, which voted to ratify the United States Constitution. Walke IV was one of two representatives from Princess Anne County.

The first Thomas Walke (I) settled in this area in 1662 from Barbados and began a trade business between the Virginia colony and Barbados, a trade which likely involved rum and slavery. He had strong connections with William Byrd I. Thomas Walke III died in 1761 and left his son the then-7,000 acres (2,800 ha) plantation and 55 slaves. In 1783 Thomas Walke IV petitioned to reclaim slaves taken by the British during the American Revolution. Some of those slaves made their way to Nova Scotia. Thomas IV was a Whig, whereas Princess Anne County was mostly Loyalists.

The property stayed in the Walke family until 1822, was 300 acres (120 ha) at the time, then changed hands many times. Currently it has about 3 acres (1.2 ha) and has been owned by the Princess Anne County/Virginia Beach Historic Society since 1966. It is still lived in.

The house is open for tour on a limited basis in the summer.

== Location and architecture ==
The house acquired its name because of its location next to Wolf Snare Creek, on the south side of its upper part. The house sits in a high noise area between Naval Air Station Oceana and Interstate 264. It was almost knocked down to make room for an access ramp for the interstate, but preservationists managed to save the property.

The lane to the house at 2040 Potter's Road is lined by many trees, including crepe myrtles. The house is open to the public on a very limited basis. The view of the house is mostly obscured by trees from Potter's Road but beyond the trees it is an open, flat, marshy, area.

The house is in two stories and built with Flemish bond brickwork. A passage runs through the center of the house. It has raised paneling and wainscoting. The house was listed in the Virginia Landmarks Register (Virginia Historic Landmark) in 1974 and the US National Register of Historic Places in 1975.

== See also ==
- National Register of Historic Places listings in Virginia Beach, Virginia
