= Adam Thoroughgood House =

Historic house in Virginia, United States

- Thoroughgood House
- U.S. National Register of Historic Places
- U.S. National Historic Landmark
- Virginia Landmarks Register
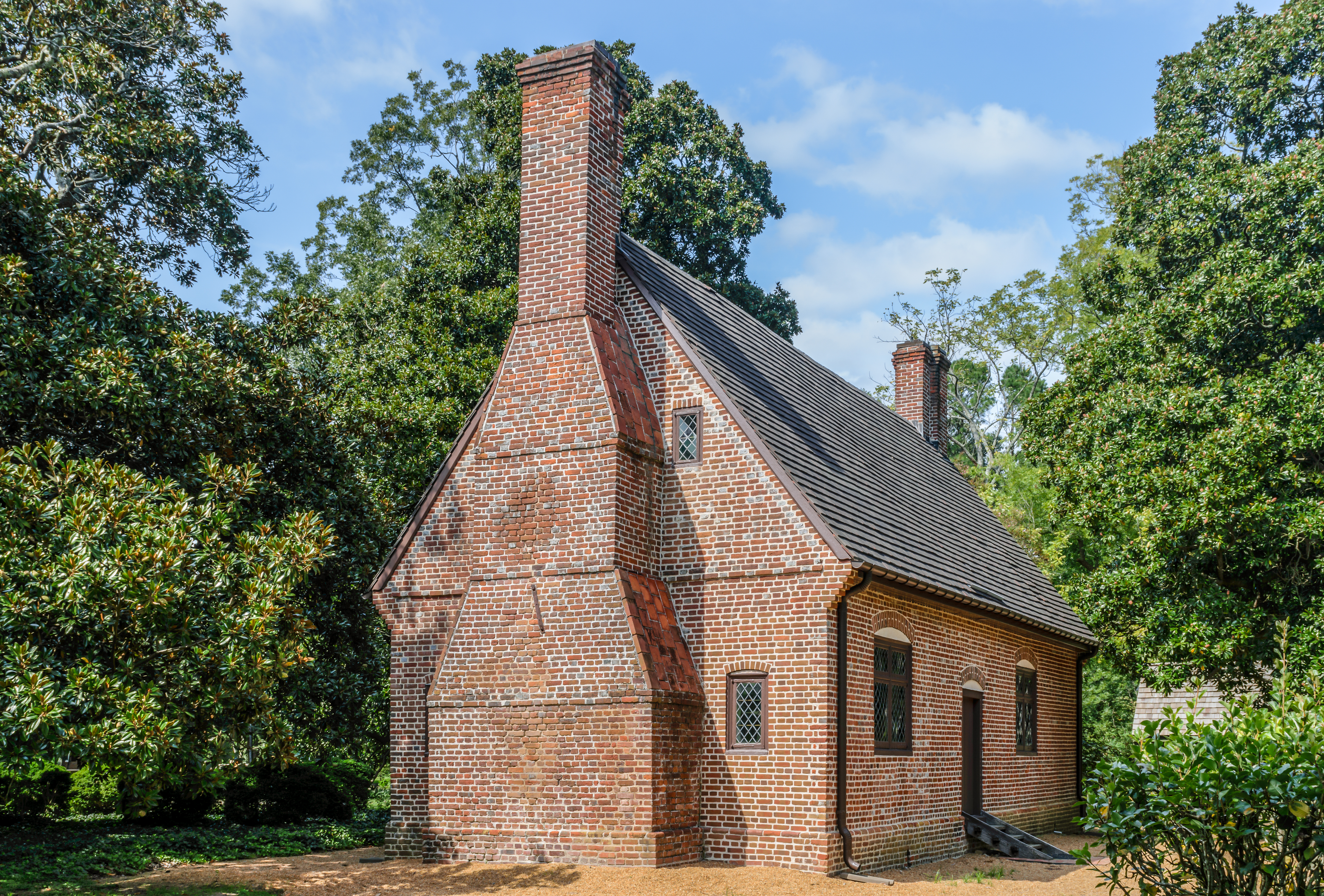
- South view of Thoroughgood House, Sep 2017

- Location within Virginia Location within the United States
- Location: 1636 Parrish Road; Virginia Beach, Virginia
- Coordinates: 36°53′36″N 76°6′47″W
- Area: 4 acres (1.6 ha)
- Built: ca. 1719
- Architectural style: Central-passage house
- NRHP reference No.: 66000921
- VLR No.: 134-0033

Significant dates
- Added to NRHP: October 15, 1966
- Designated NHL: October 9, 1960
- Designated VLR: September 9, 1969

The Thoroughgood House is a brick house located at 1636 Parish Road, in the neighborhood of Thoroughgood, in Virginia Beach, Virginia, United States. It was built ca. 1719. It was formerly known as the Adam Thoroughgood House. It was not built by Adam. The building underwent major restorations in 1923 and in the 1950s and has served as a museum since opening to the public April 29, 1957. Much of the current structure was most likely the house of the great-grandson of Adam Thoroughgood. The City of Virginia Beach acquired the property in 2003. A 2004 grant application to the National Park Service resulted in a $150,000 award from the prestigious Save America's Treasures program. The City matched that amount as required. This restoration took longer and cost more than expected, but the house reopened in May 2011.

== Adam Thoroughgood ==
Adam Thoroughgood (1604–1640), an indentured servant who arrived in Virginia in 1622, became a community leader, a member of the House of Burgesses at Jamestown, and was granted a headright of 5,350 acres (21.7 km^{2}) in 1635.

Adam Thoroughgood was from King's Lynn, Norfolk, England, and the naming of many local features can be traced back to his childhood home, including the Lynnhaven River, the City of Norfolk, and Norfolk County and the City of South Norfolk (the last two of which combined to become the new City of Chesapeake in 1963).

== Historic designations ==
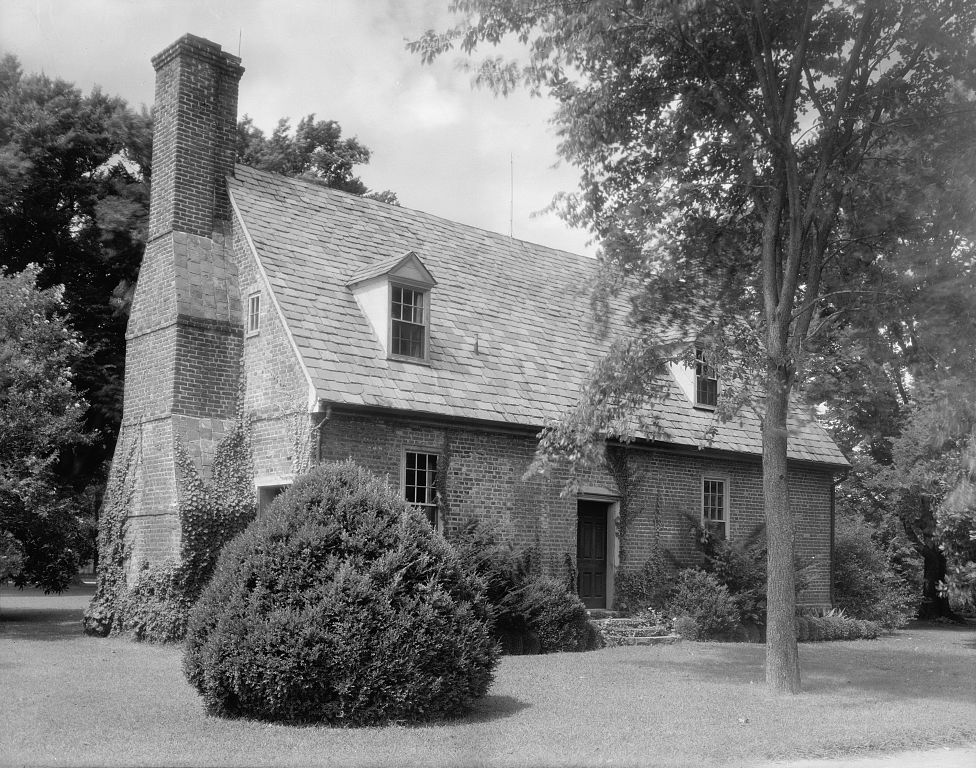
Thoroughgood House by Frances Benjamin Johnston

It was designated a National Historic Landmark in 1960, as a prime example of early colonial architecture in Virginia. It was listed in the US National Register of Historic Places in 1966.

Another nearby surviving early 18th-century house in Virginia Beach is the Adam Keeling House.

== See also ==
- List of the oldest buildings in Virginia
- National Register of Historic Places listings in Virginia Beach, Virginia
