= Neptune Festival =

Annual festival in Virginia Beach, Virginia, U.S.

Coordinates: 36.841605°N 76.078776°W

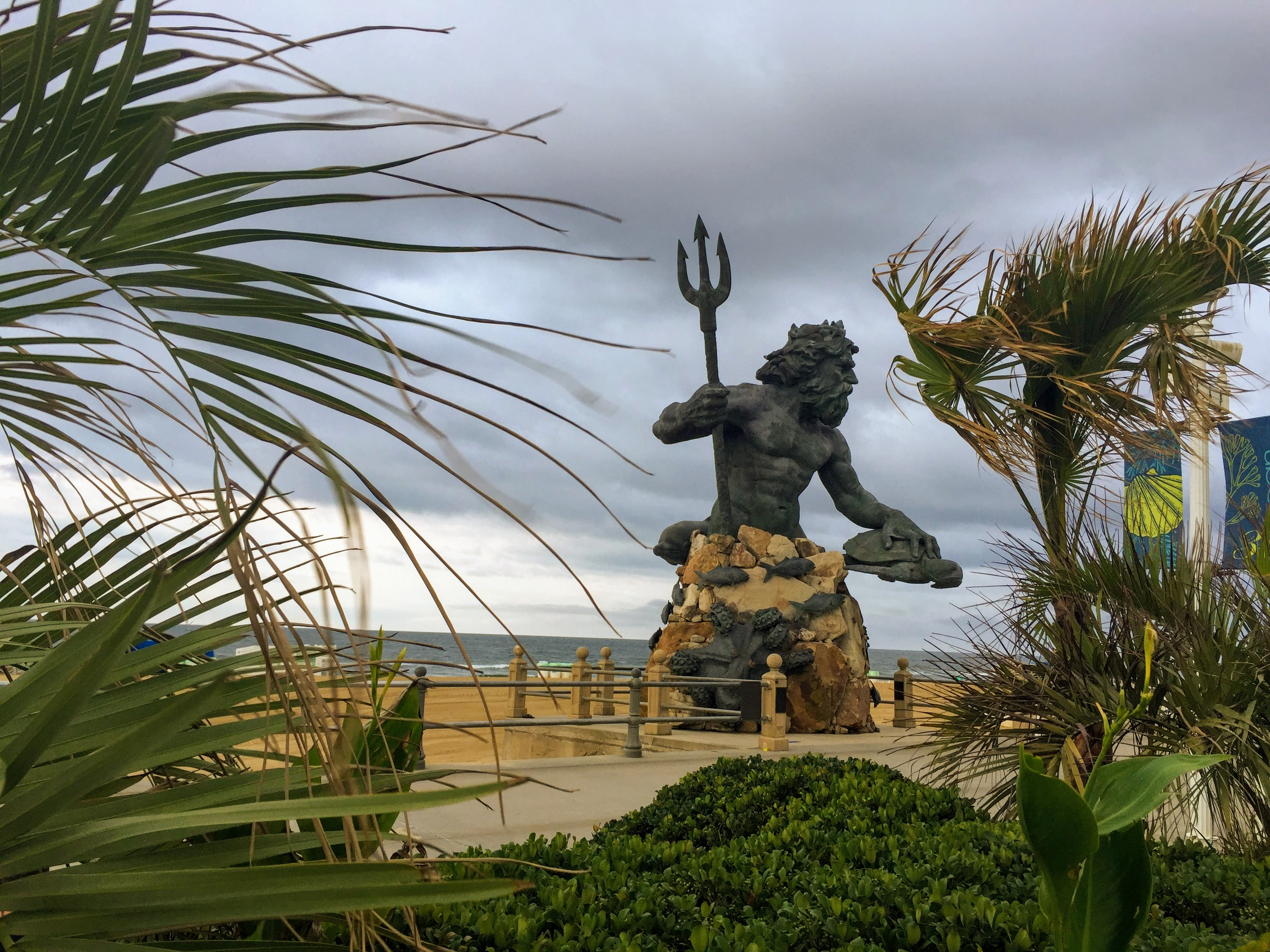
Neptune Statue in Virginia Beach

The Neptune Festival is an annual festival in Virginia Beach, Virginia. Virginia Beach Chamber of Commerce President and RK Chevrolet founder Richard Kline created the idea in 1973, to celebrate the heritage of the city. The first celebration took place in 1974.

The Virginian-Pilot Beacon reported attendance of about 50,000 people at the first festival, with seafood selling out before the festival ended. Actor Lyle Waggoner from The Carol Burnett Show was the grand marshal of the parade.

At the corner of 31st and Atlantic in Virginia Beach, there is a 34-foot-tall (10 m), 12.5 ton statue of Neptune, Roman god of the Seas. The statue was dedicated on September 30, 2005, during the Neptune Festival Boardwalk weekend.

The Boardwalk Weekend includes the International Sandsculpting Championship, Art & Craft Show, food, and live music. It also includes a surfing contest, a foot race, a volleyball tournament, and a parade. The event is free and open to the public, with the exception of a tent-covered viewing fee of the sand sculptures.

The Neptune Festival crowns and ceremonial King or Queen Neptune each year. Alongside the monarch, a Royal Court consisting of local business men and women and local high school representatives. In 2025, the first Queen Neptune was selected, naming Buffy Barefoot as the 2025 Queen Neptune.
