= Lynnhaven House =

Historic house in Virginia, United States

- U.S. National Register of Historic Places
- Virginia Landmarks Register
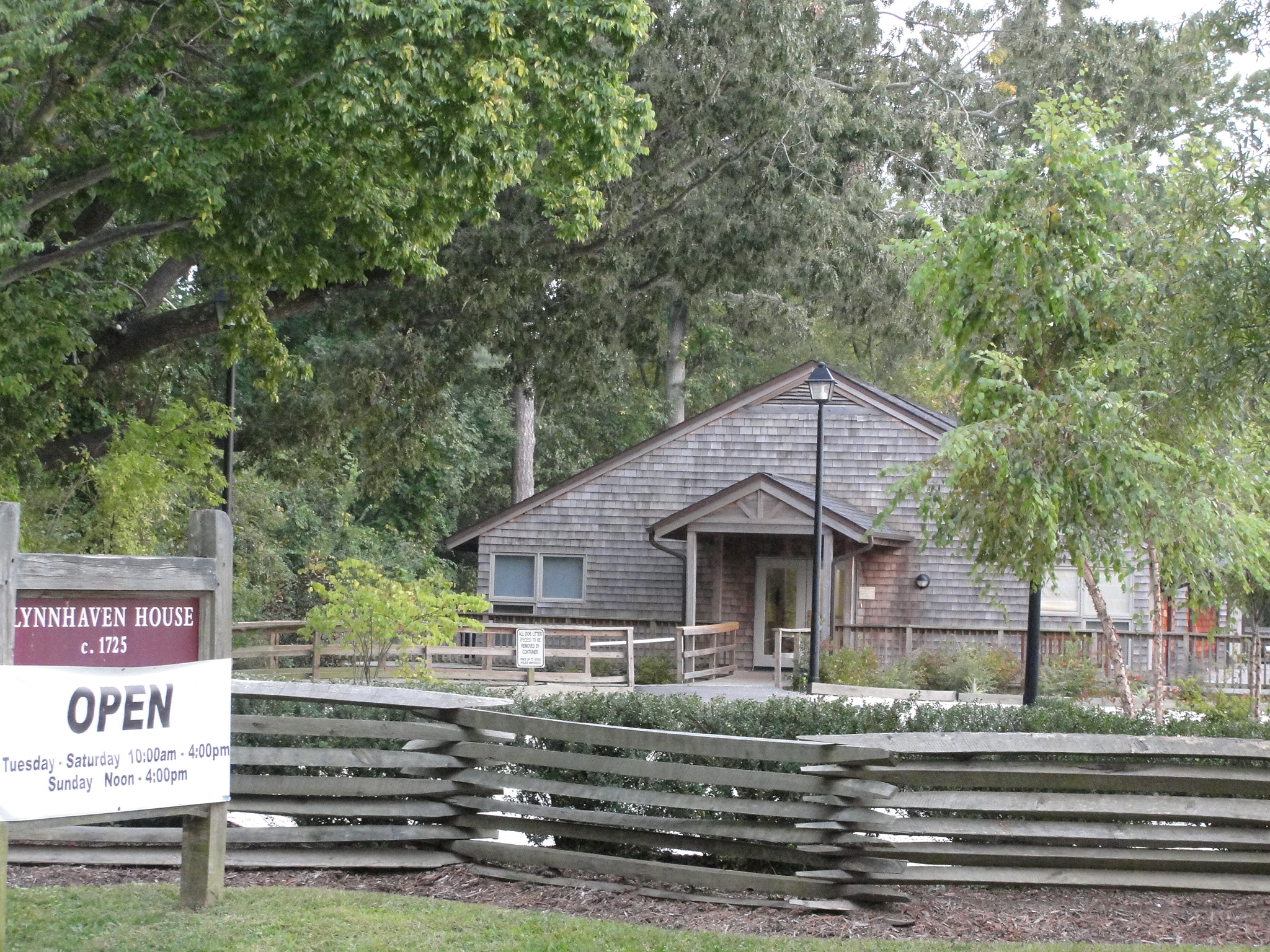

- Location within Virginia Location within the United States
- Location: 4409 Wishart Rd., Virginia Beach, Virginia
- Coordinates: 36.871944°N 76.129167°W
- Area: 110 acres (45 ha)
- Built: c. 1725
- NRHP reference No.: 69000363 100011638 (decrease)
- VLR No.: 134-0037

Significant dates
- Added to NRHP: November 12, 1969
- Boundary decrease: April 3, 2025
- Designated VLR: May 13, 1969

The Lynnhaven House, also Wishart–Boush House, Wishart House, and Boush House, which was built circa 1725, is an example of 18th century Tidewater Virginia vernacular architecture and is located in Virginia Beach, Virginia. Although it was founded by the Thelaball family, it is sometimes referred to as the Boush House or the Wishart House. The house was given the name the Lynnhaven House due to its close proximity to the Lynnhaven River, which flows on the same property. Originally, the home, located at 4405 Wishart Road, stood on a 250-acre plantation. Now, it is located on five and a half acres.

This house reflects the social and economic status of Francis Thelaball, a middling plantation owner who built it for his family. This home provides a glimpse into the life of middle-class planter rather than a wealthy plantation owner. Francis, his wife Abigail, their five sons, an apprentice, and several enslaved people all lived in the house from 1725 to 1727. While relatively little is known about Francis and his wife Abigail, much more is known about Francis's cousin, Joyce Langley Thelaball who was born in 1694. Architectural and design details including brick jack arches, a close-spindle staircase with teardrop pendant, and ship's lap floor construction reveal a builder concerned with quality as well as artistry. Behind the historic house lies a small cemetery with plots that date back to the American Revolutionary War. This 19th-century burial ground of the Boush family stands watch to the south of the house that the family once owned, and is why the house is sometimes referred to as the Boush House.

The house was used as a private residence until 1971 when it was donated to Preservation Virginia (formerly known as the Association for the Preservation of Virginia Antiquities) by the heirs of William W. Oliver III. It was under the care of Preservation Virginia before the City of Virginia Beach acquired the property. The 18th century home has had very few changes made throughout the years and is estimated to still have 85% of its original materials intact, which makes it one of the country's best-preserved buildings from that time period.

The Lynnhaven House was added to the National Register of Historic Places in 1969.

== See also ==
- National Register of Historic Places listings in Virginia Beach, Virginia
