= Francis Land House =

Historic house in Virginia, United States

- U.S. National Register of Historic Places
- Virginia Landmarks Register
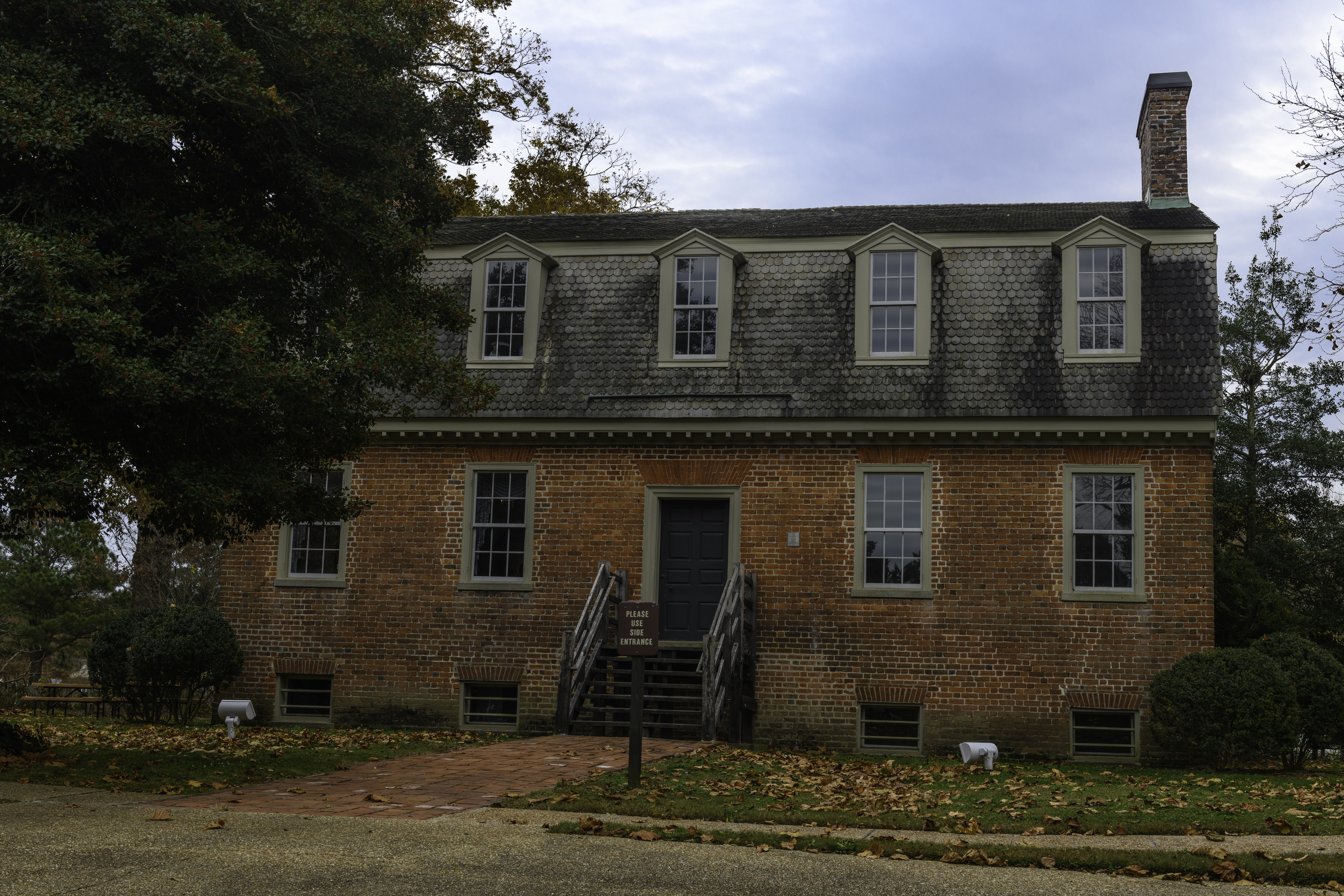
- Francis Land House in December 2017

- Location within Virginia Location within the United States
- Location: 3131 Virginia Beach Blvd. Virginia Beach, Virginia
- Coordinates: 36°50′28″N 76°4′48″W
- Built: 1804
- Architect: Land, Francis
- Architectural style: Georgian
- NRHP reference No.: 75002118; 100011852 (decrease)
- VLR No.: 134-0031

Significant dates
- Added to NRHP: May 12, 1975
- Boundary decrease: May 19, 2025
- Designated VLR: April 15, 1975

The Francis Land House, or Rose Hall, is a historic brick house in located within the Rose Hall District near Princess Anne Plaza in Virginia Beach, Virginia. It was the plantation home of the prominent Land family, a founding family of Princess Anne County, Virginia.

== History ==
Land family history on the site spanned the 1630s to the 1850s. The house passed through six males named Francis Land and then the last Francis' daughters before being sold to another family. Slaves were first documented on the site in 1694, with importation of new slaves up to the 1730s. In the mid-18th century the plantation had as many as 20 slaves. The first Francis Land arrived in the area in 1638–1639 and later acquired 1,020 acres (410 ha) of land by 1654, 200 of which was acquired via head rights by bringing four people with him. The plantation got as small as 350 acres (140 ha) over the next 150 years and at the time the current house was built the plantation was just under 700 acres (280 ha). The current house sits on 7 acres (2.8 ha) of that original plantation, and is now in the midst of a very commercialized area.

The house was at one time thought to have been built in 1732, but recent research has placed its construction in the period 1805–1810 by Francis Land VI. Francis VI and his family lived there around 1805–1819, when Francis VI died. When Francis Moseley Land built the house his family had already been living on that land for 150 years. Francis VI and his wife had two daughters, Mary E. Land and Anne White Land. Mary married John Newton Walke (their son Frank Anthony Walke was a Confederate Soldier). Anne married John Minson Galt in 1833. Their son Francis Land Galt was surgeon and acting paymaster of the famed Confederate raider CSS Alabama. Mary and Anne held onto the land until about 1850–1851, when it was first sold outside their family. In the early 1900s, Junius Thompson Sheets and his wife, Flora, purchased land, which included the historic Francis Land house, in what is now Lynnhaven, Virginia. The roof was raised 20 inches (510 mm) in 1912. In 1929, their son, Emmett Don Sheets sold the property to their daughter, Jane (Jennie) and her husband, Raymond Garfield DeFrees.

A large portion of the property was lost to foreclosure during the 1930s, but the DeFrees family kept the primary residence, the Francis Land House, and surrounding acreage as a dairy farm until the mid-1950s.

Raymond DeFrees was a civil engineer, and traveled frequently from Washington, D.C. to Florida while working for the Bureau of Evaluation. He was also a charter member of and teacher for the Amateur Astronomer's Club in Washington, D.C. Many groups came to the historic Francis Land house and farm to learn from him.

Jennie DeFrees managed the dairy farm while raising their son and four daughters: Lindsay (who served in WWII), Florence, Flora Louise, Alice, and Helen. She also played the organ at her church. During WWII, she oversaw German prisoners of war who had been assigned to the historic farm. During World War II, Naval Air Station Oceana opened nearby, and a major road was built through the area. By the 1950s commercial development began along Virginia Beach Boulevard and during the mid-late 1900s, the house was the Rose Hall Dress Shop.

In the early-mid-1970s a developer wanted to tear down the house and build a shopping mall, but the City of Virginia Beach stepped in and purchased the house and 7 acres of surrounding land in 1975; subsequently operating it as a historic house museum since 1986. Special programs for schools, Scouts, and the general public are offered throughout the year. Adjacent to the house are the Rose Hall Apartments and Rose Hall Professional Center.

== Description ==
The house's exterior is Georgian style and the inside features period rooms furnished with Federal style antiques and reproductions with heart of pine floors. The exterior walls are double depth Flemish bond brickwork. The manicured grounds include herb, vegetable, flax, formal, and "pleasure" gardens, as well as a history park which includes a constructed .1 miles (0.16 km) nature trail in a wooded wetland with interpretive sign exhibit. The trail leads to what was once the Pine Tree Branch of the Lynnhaven River.

== Listing ==
The house was listed in the Virginia Landmarks Register (Virginia Historic Landmark) and the US National Register of Historic Places in 1975. While the house has a plaque stating it was placed on the "National Register of Historic Landmarks" in 1975, it has not been designated a National Historic Landmark.

== See also ==
- List of the oldest buildings in Virginia
- National Register of Historic Places listings in Virginia Beach, Virginia
