= Briarwood (Virginia Beach, Virginia) =

Historic house in Virginia, United States

- U.S. National Register of Historic Places
- Virginia Landmarks Register
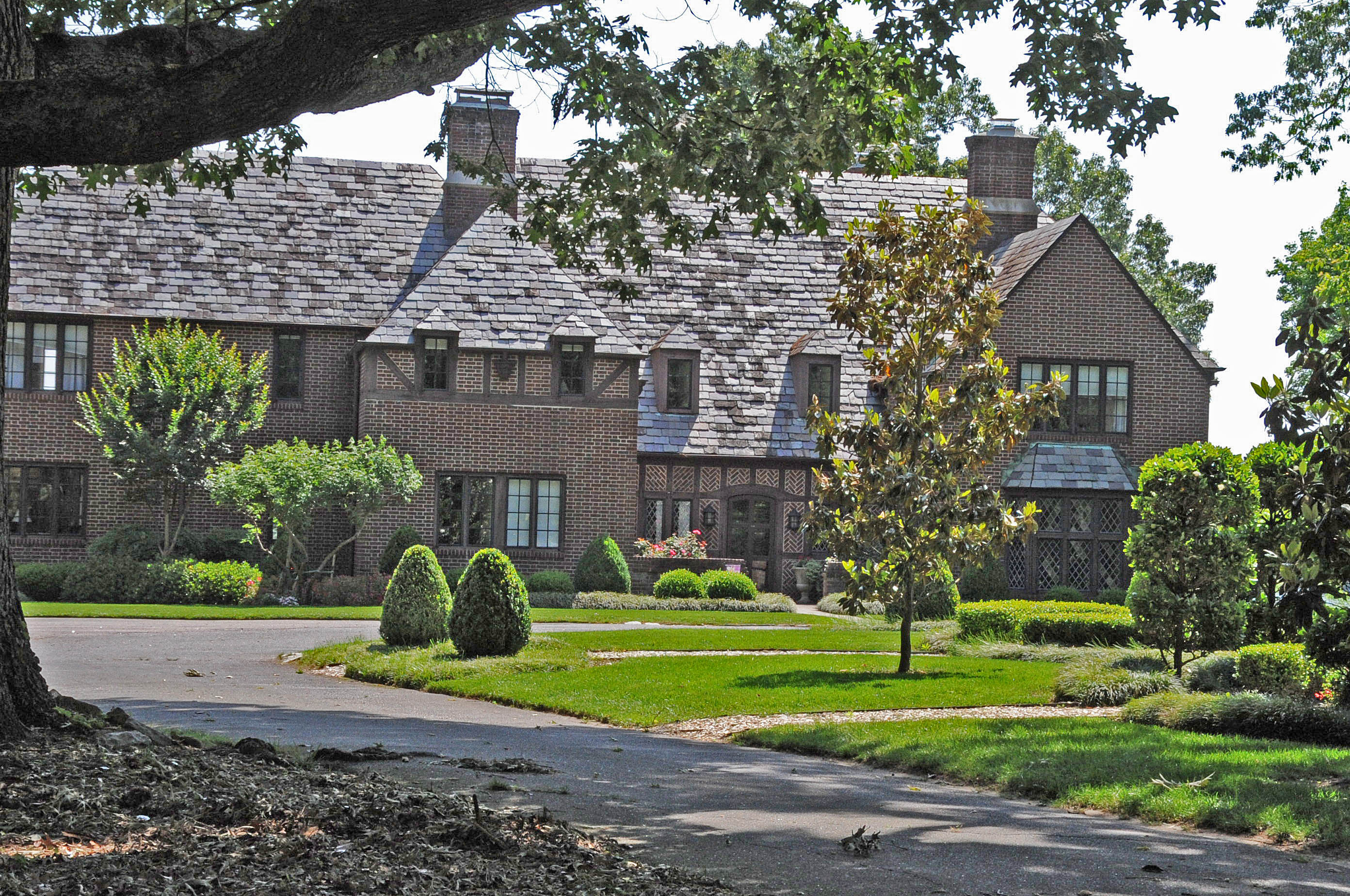

- Location within Virginia Location within the United States
- Location: 1500 Southwick Rd., Virginia Beach, Virginia
- Coordinates: 36°51′39″N 76°00′49″W
- Area: 4.05 acres (1.64 ha)
- Built: 1932
- Built by: Nugent, Clayton C.
- Architect: Taylor, Wickham C.
- Architectural style: Tudor Revival
- NRHP reference No.: 12000547
- VLR No.: 134-0600

Significant dates
- Added to NRHP: August 22, 2012
- Designated VLR: June 21, 2012

Briarwood, also known as Bingham House, is a historic home located at Virginia Beach, Virginia. It was built in 1932, and is a two-story, 6,000 square foot, Tudor Revival style brick dwelling. It features steeply pitched gabled and hipped roof elements clad in historic slate shingles as well as three corbelled brick chimneys.

It was added to the National Register of Historic Places in 2012.

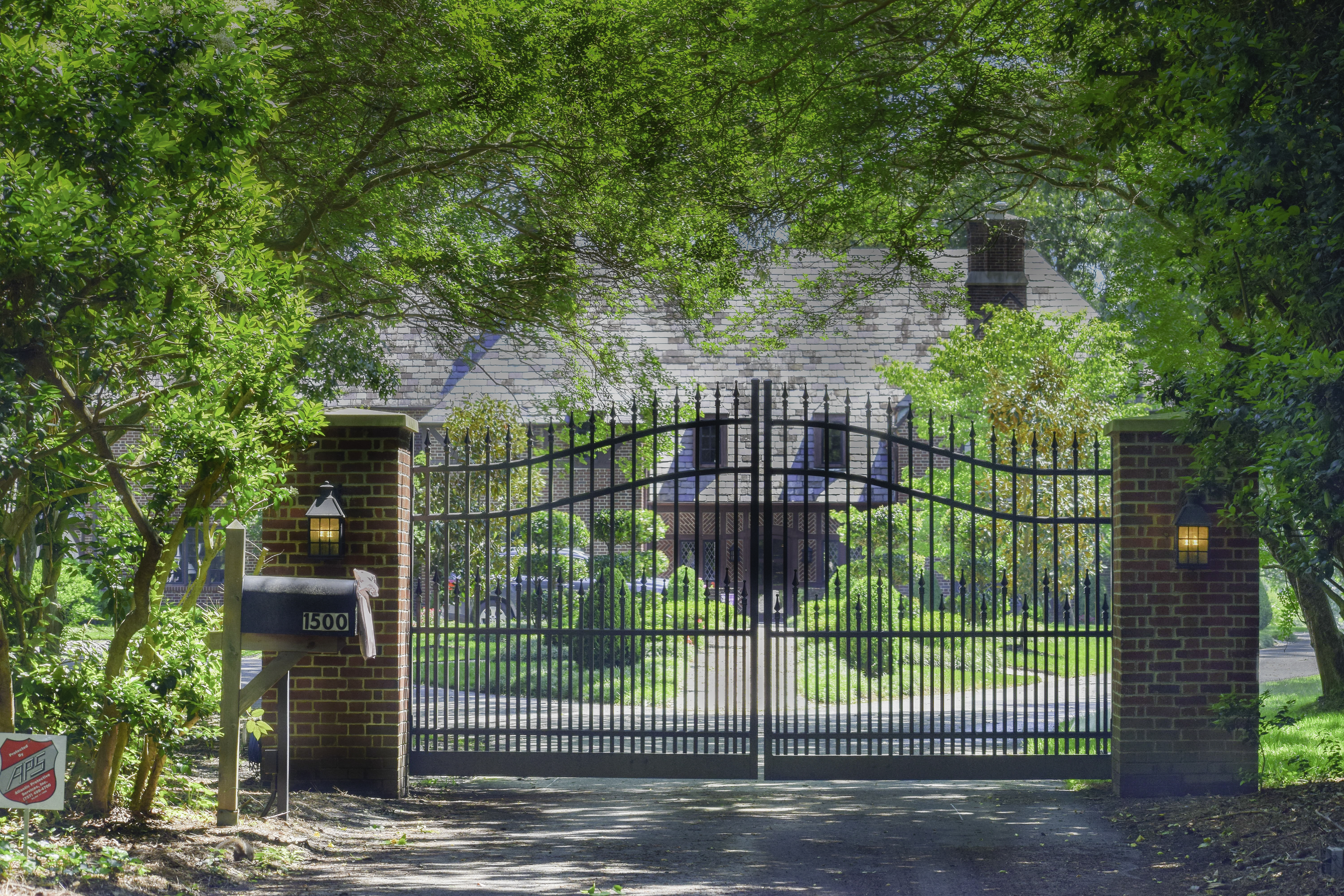
Entrance
