= Pleasant Hall =

Historic house in Virginia, United States

- U.S. National Register of Historic Places
- Virginia Landmarks Register
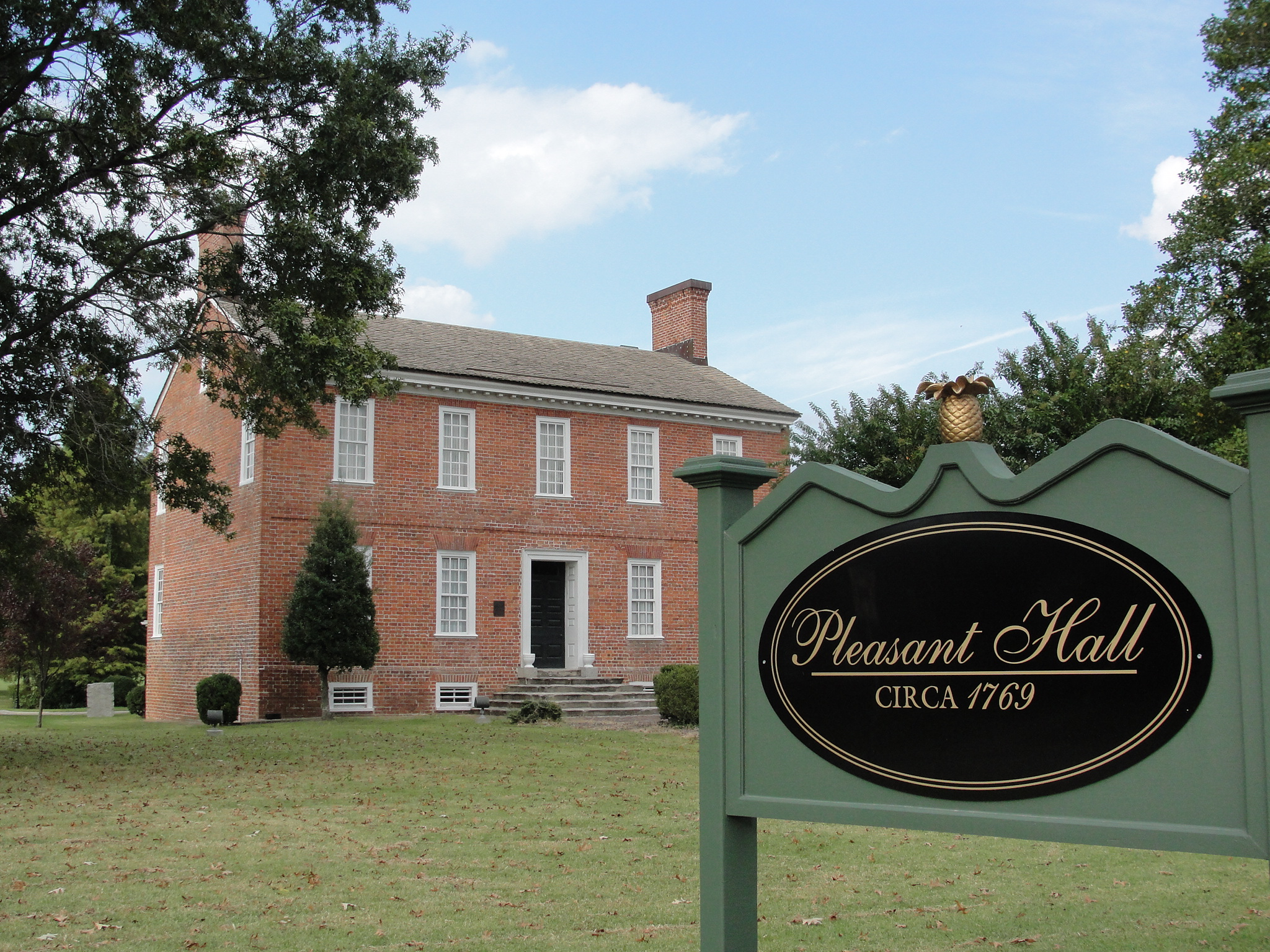
- Pleasant Hall, September 2012

- Location within Virginia Location within the United States
- Location: 5184 Princess Anne Rd., Virginia Beach, Virginia
- Coordinates: 36°49′39″N 76°9′45″W
- Area: 2 acres (0.81 ha)
- Built: 1769
- Architectural style: Georgian
- NRHP reference No.: 73002229
- VLR No.: 134-0027

Significant dates
- Added to NRHP: January 25, 1973
- Designated VLR: October 17, 1972

Pleasant Hall is a historic home located in Kempsville section of Virginia Beach, Virginia. Built in 1769, it is a two-story, five-bay, double pile Georgian-style brick dwelling. It is topped by a shallow gable roof and has two wide interior-end chimney stacks with corbeled caps.

It was added to the National Register of Historic Places in 1973.
