= Pembroke Manor =

Historic house in Virginia, United States

- U.S. National Register of Historic Places
- Virginia Landmarks Register
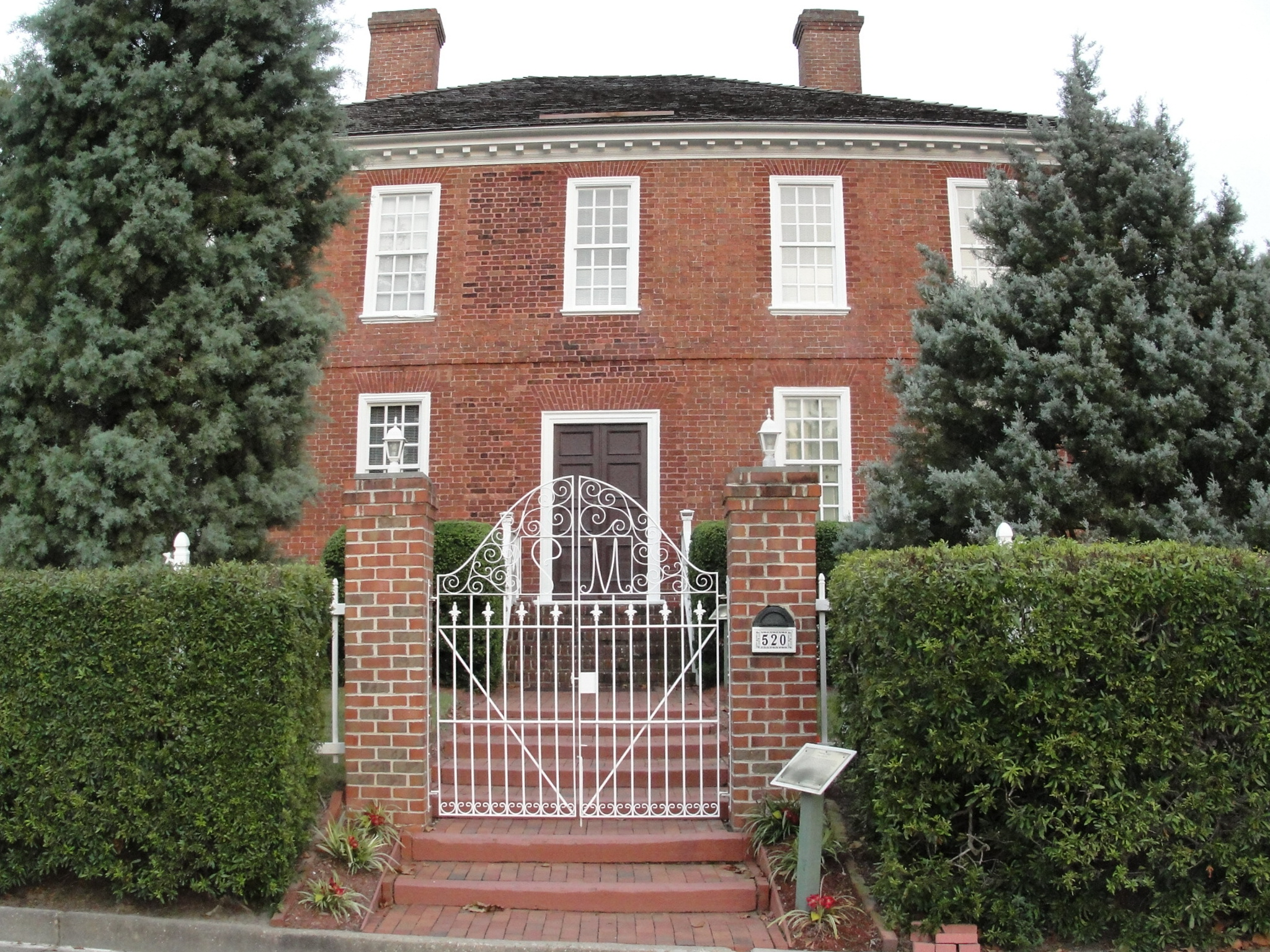
- Pembroke Manor, September 2012

- Location within Virginia Location within the United States
- Location: E of jct. of Rtes. 627, 647, and U.S. 58, Virginia Beach, Virginia
- Coordinates: 36°51′8″N 76°8′2″W
- Area: 1 acre (0.40 ha)
- Built: 1764
- Architectural style: Georgian
- NRHP reference No.: 70000887
- VLR No.: 134-0026

Significant dates
- Added to NRHP: February 26, 1970
- Designated VLR: December 2, 1969

Pembroke Manor is a historic home located at Virginia Beach, Virginia. It was built in 1764 by Jonathan Saunders, and is a two-story, five-bay, Georgian-style brick dwelling. It is topped by a shallow hipped roof.

It was added to the National Register of Historic Places in 1970.
