= List of botanical gardens and arboretums in Virginia =

This list of botanical gardens and arboretums in Virginia is intended to include all significant botanical gardens and arboretums in the U.S. state of Virginia

| Name | Image | Affiliation | City |
|---|---|---|---|
| Boxerwood Gardens | | | Lexington |
| Joseph Bryan Park Azalea Garden | | | Richmond |
| Edith J. Carrier Arboretum | | James Madison University | Harrisonburg |
| Chesapeake Arboretum | | | Chesapeake |
| Forest Lawn Cemetery | | | Richmond |
| Lewis Ginter Botanical Garden | | | Richmond |
| Green Spring Gardens | | | Alexandria |
| Hahn Horticulture Garden | | Virginia Polytechnic Institute and State University | Blacksburg |
| Maymont | | | Richmond |
| Meadowlark Botanical Gardens | | | Vienna |
| Museum of the Shenandoah Valley | | | Winchester |
| Norfolk Botanical Garden | | | Norfolk |
| Oatlands Historic House & Gardens | | | Leesburg |
| Old City Cemetery | | | Lynchburg |
| River Farm | | American Horticultural Society | Alexandria |
| Ticonderoga Botanical Gardens | | | Chantilly |
| Tidewater Arboretum | | | Virginia Beach |
| Orland E. White Research Arboretum | | University of Virginia | Boyce |
| Williamsburg Botanical Garden | | | Williamsburg |

== See also ==
- List of botanical gardens and arboretums in the United States
