= Chesapeake shooting =

Chesapeake shooting may refer to:

- Murder of Jiansheng Chen, in 2017, grandfather who was fatally shot by a security guard
- 2022 Chesapeake shooting, mass shooting in a Walmart
