= List of shootings in Virginia =

Notable shooting incidents that have occurred in the U.S. state of Virginia include:

- George Lincoln Rockwell, founder of the American Nazi Party, was shot and killed while leaving a laundromat in Arlington, Virginia, on August 25, 1967.
- Richard McCoy Jr., an escaped convict, fired at FBI agents in Virginia Beach, Virginia, and an agent fired back with a shotgun, killing McCoy, on November 9, 1974.
- Rockbridge County John Doe, an unidentified murder victim, was found on May 27, 1987, having been killed by two gunshot wounds.
- At Atlantic Shores Christian School in Virginia Beach on December 16, 1988, 16-year-old student Nicholas Elliott shot two teachers with a Mac-10 9-millimeter machine pistol, killing 41-year-old Karen Farley and critically wounding 37-year-old Sam Marino, then began firing on a classroom full of students before the gun jammed; no students were hit.
- 1993 shootings at CIA Headquarters, Langley, Virginia, on January 25, 1993: Mir Qazi killed two CIA employees in their cars and wounded three others.
- D.C. sniper attacks: a series of coordinated shootings over three weeks in October 2002. Ten people were killed and three others wounded in the Baltimore-Washington area and along Interstate 95 in Virginia.
- Rodney Pocceschi, a Virginia Beach, Virginia police officer, was killed in the line of duty on June 23, 2003.
- William Morva on August 20, 2006, shot Sheriff's Deputy Corporal Eric Sutphin and hospital security guard Derrick McFarland, in the town of Blacksburg, Virginia.
- Virginia Tech Shooting: on April 16, 2007, at the Virginia Polytechnic Institute and State University, in Blacksburg, Virginia, Seung-Hui Cho shot 49 people, killing 32 and wounding 17.
- Mike Brim, an NFL cornerback, died in a shootout on April 19, 2005, in Richmond, Virginia.
- 2010 Appomattox shootings: on January 19, 2010, Christopher Bryan Speight shot his sister, her husband, and her son and daughter at their home, as well as four other people.
- 2010 Pentagon shooting: on March 4, 2010, John Patrick Bedell shot and wounded two Pentagon police officers at a security checkpoint in the Pentagon station of the Washington Metro rapid transit system in Arlington County, Virginia, just outside Washington, D.C.
- Death of Kirill Denyakin occurred on April 23, 2011, in Portsmouth, Virginia, when Denyakin was shot and killed by police.
- Shooting of John Geer occurred on August 29, 2013, in Pohick Hills, Springfield, Virginia, when Geer was killed by police.
- Death of William Chapman occurred on April 22, 2015, in Portsmouth, Virginia, when Chapman was shot and killed by police.
- Murders of Alison Parker and Adam Ward: they were fatally shot on August 26, 2015, near Smith Mountain Lake in Moneta, Virginia, by Vester Lee Flanagan II, a.k.a. Bryce Williams.
- FreightCar America shooting, October 25, 2016, in Roanoke, Virginia: Getachew Fekede killed an employee and wounded three others.
- 2017 Congressional baseball shooting, June 14, 2017, in Alexandria, Virginia: Republican member of Congress Steve Scalise was shot while practicing baseball. Also shot were Crystal Griner, a U.S. Capitol Police officer, Zack Barth, a congressional aide, and Matt Mika, a lobbyist.
- Shooting of Bijan Ghaisar occurred on November 17, 2017, when Ghaisar was fatally shot by police after a traffic collision on the George Washington Memorial Parkway in Northern Virginia.
- Shooting of Jiansheng Chen occurred on January 26, 2017, when Jiansheng Chen was shot dead by a security officer in Chesapeake, Virginia.
- 2019 Virginia Beach shooting, occurred on May 31, 2019.
- 2022 Bridgewater College shooting, occurred on February 1, 2022.
- 2022 University of Virginia shooting, occurred on November 13, 2022.
- 2022 Chesapeake shooting, occurred on November 22, 2022.
- Shooting of Abby Zwerner, occurred on January 6, 2023, when an unidentified 6-year-old boy open-fired at a teacher in her mid-30s, critically injuring her. Because of his young age, his name and early information have not been identified, and the shooting was listed as one of the most unique incidents in Virginia's history.

== See also ==
- John Wilkes Booth assassinated President Abraham Lincoln in Washington, D.C., on April 14, 1865. He fled to a farm in rural northern Virginia where he was shot.
