= Mayoral elections in Chesapeake, Virginia =

Elections for mayor in Chesapeake, Virginia

Elections are currently held every four years to elect the mayor of Chesapeake, Virginia.

== 2004 ==
2004 Chesapeake mayoral election
- May 4, 2004
Candidate	William Ward	W. Joe Newman	James Walz
Party	Independent	Independent	Independent
Popular vote	13,633	12,505	252
Percentage	51.40%	47.15%	0.95%
Mayor before election
William Ward
Independent
Elected mayor
William Ward
Independent

The 2004 Chesapeake mayoral election was held on May 4, 2004. It saw the reelection of the incumbent mayor William E. Ward.

Election results
Candidate	Votes	%
William Ward	13,633	51.40
W. Joe	12,505	47.15
James Walz	252	0.95
Others	134	0.50
Total votes	26,524	100

== 2008 ==
2008 Chesapeake mayoral election
- May 6, 2008
Candidate	Alan Krasnoff	Rebecca Adams
Party	Independent	Independent
Popular vote	12,546	10,886
Percentage	53.46%	46.38%
Mayor before election
Dalton Edge
Independent
Elected mayor
Alan Krasnoff
Independent

The 2008 Chesapeake mayoral election was held on May 6, 2008. It saw the election of Alan Krasnoff, a member of the city council.

Election results
Candidate	Votes	%
Alan Krasnoff	12,546	53.46
Rebecca Adams	10,886	46.38
Others	38	0.16
Total votes	23,470	100

== 2012 ==
2012 Chesapeake mayoral election
- May 1, 2012
Candidate	Alan Krasnoff	Burnie Mansfield Jr.	Harrietta Gibbons
Party	Independent	Independent	Independent
Popular vote	12,578	3,327	935
Percentage	74.27%	19.64%	5.52%
Mayor before election
Alan Krasnoff
Independent
Elected mayor
Alan Krasnoff
Independent

The 2012 Chesapeake mayoral election was held on May 1, 2012. The incumbent mayor Alan Krasnoff won a second term to his mayoral office.

Election results
Candidate	Votes	%
Alan Krasnoff	12,578	74.27
Burnie Mansfield	3,327	19.64
Harrietta Gibbons	935	5.52
Others	97	0.57
Total votes	16,937	100

== 2016 ==
The 2016 Chesapeake mayoral election was held on May 3, 2016. The incumbent mayor Alan Krasnoff won by default due to the lack of opposing candidates.

== 2018 ==
2018 Chesapeake special mayoral election
- May 1, 2018
Candidate	Richard West	Jo Anne Gallant
Party	Independent	Independent
Popular vote	13,342	9,630
Percentage	57.81%	41.72%
Mayor before election
Alan Krasnoff
Independent
Elected mayor
Richard West
Independent

On the municipal election of Chesapeake in November 2017, the incumbent mayor Alan Krasnoff ran for and won the election was the Chesapeake City Clerk of Court. Since Krasnoff left the post of mayor on November 14, Richard West, a city council member, became the acting mayor. A special mayoral election was held on May 1, 2018. It saw the election of the acting mayor Richard West.

Election results
Candidate	Votes	%
Richard West	13,342	57.81
Jo Anne Gallant	9,630	41.72
Others	109	0.47
Total votes	23,081	100

== 2020 ==
2020 Chesapeake mayoral election
- May 19, 2020
Candidate	Richard West	Lenard Myers II
Party	Independent	Independent
Popular vote	21,888	9,087
Percentage	65.94%	27.38%
Candidate	Steffanie Aubuchon	Palmer Smith
Party	Independent	Independent
Popular vote	1,386	641
Percentage	4.18%	1.93%
Mayor before election
Richard West
Independent
Elected mayor
Richard West
Independent

The 2020 Chesapeake mayoral election was held on May 19, 2020. It saw the reelection of the incumbent mayor Richard West.

Election results
Candidate	Votes	%
Richard West	21,888	65.99
Lenard Myers II	9,087	27.39
Steffanie Aubuchon	1,386	4.18
Palmer Smith	641	1.93
Write-in	169	0.51
Total votes	33,171	100

== List of mayors ==
The following served as mayors of Chesapeake:

- Colon L. Hall, 1963
- Howard R. McPherson, 1963-1965
- G.A. Treakle, 1965-1970
- William S Overton, 1970-1972
- Marian P. Whitehurst, 1972-1980
- Sidney M. Oman, 1980-1984, 1986-1988
- J. Bennie Jennings, 1984-1986
- David I. Wynne, 1988-1990
- William E Ward, 1990-2004 First African-American mayor
- Dalton S Edge, 2004-2008
- Alan P. Krasnoff, 2008-2017
- Rick West, 2017-present

== See also ==
- Chesapeake history
