= List of Bloomsburg University of Pennsylvania alumni =

Prominent alumni of Bloomsburg University of Pennsylvania in Bloomsburg, Pennsylvania include:

- Lou Barletta, former member of the US House of Representatives (PA-11).
- Dennis Bermudez, UFC fighter.
- Joe Colone (1924-2009), one-year NBA player for the New York Knicks (1948–1949).
- Chuck Daly (1930-2009), NBA coach, and head coach of the first USA Dream Team.
- Jahri Evans, Offensive guard for the New Orleans Saints, Super Bowl XLIV Champion (2010).
- Matt Feiler, Offensive Guard for the Pittsburgh Steelers.
- Percy Wilfred Griffiths (1893–1983), U.S. Representative for the 15th District of Ohio (1943–1949).
- Tim Holden, U.S. Representative for the 17th District of Pennsylvania (1993-2013).
- Skënder Hyseni.
- Isaac Clinton Kline (1858–1947), U.S. Representative for the 16th District of Pennsylvania (1921–1923).
- Jessica Leccia, actress best known as Natalia Rivera on Guiding Light
- John Vandling Lesher (1866–1932), U.S. Representative for the 16th District of Pennsylvania (1913–1921).
- Kelly Lewis, former member of Pennsylvania House of Representatives.
- Danny Litwhiler (1916-2011), record-setting MLB baseball player for Boston Braves and other teams.
- Frederick William Magrady (1863–1954), U.S. Representative for the 17th District of Pennsylvania (1925–1933).
- Charles Clarence Pratt (1854–1916), U.S. Representative for the 14th District of Pennsylvania (1909–1911).
- David R. Millard
- Phyllis Mundy, State Representative for Pennsylvania's 120th legislative district (1991-current).
- Rodney Pocceschi, Virginia Beach police officer killed in the line of duty in 2003.
- Mark S. Schweiker, former governor of Pennsylvania.
- Frank Sheptock, football coach at Bloomsburg University, All-American linebacker for Bloomsburg in the 1980s.
- Brian Sims, Democratic member of the Pennsylvania House of Representatives in the 182nd district.
- Jimmi Simpson, Emmy nominated film and television actor.
- Bob Tucker, a former NFL player (1970–1980)
- John Willis (born 1952), American-Israeli basketball player
- Stacy Garrity, Treasurer of Commonwealth of Pennsylvania (2021 - Present)
