= Club Lake Ahoy =

Water park in Chesapeake, Virginia, US

Coordinates: 36.8039°N 76.4004°W

Club Lake Ahoy was a water park situated within a man-made lake in Chesapeake, Virginia, United States. Attractions included metal towers with high dive platforms and zip-line rides over 20 feet (6.1 m) high.

The water park has since been acquired by the City of Chesapeake and is under review for redevelopment as a city park.

== Facility ==
Club Lake Ahoy was a privately owned facility located in Chesapeake, Virginia. The man-made lake was essentially a gigantic swimming pool. It was built on a concrete base with sand that was trucked in and placed on the bottom. The water was supplied by an artesian well. There was a small sandy beach around 3/4 of the lake. The main building housed a snack bar, pool tables and various video and pinball games. At the front of the property was a playground that consisted of wooden see-saws and huge swing sets. The rear of the property had a bath house and restrooms. Adjacent to the lake was a large ranch-style house where the lake owners lived.

After years of running the park, the owner sold the property and the lake was drained. The empty blue concrete shell of what once was remains, and is partially full. Nature has begun to take over along the edges of the water making it difficult to see parts of the lake.

== Attractions ==
Club Lake Ahoy was built in an artificial lake that was outfitted with activities that were not commonly found in other pools or water parks. There were sliding boards of various heights, with water jets at the top to make them fast. Several cement platforms that rose a foot or so out of the water were also part of the lake. They could be used for resting on or for diving. In addition, a merry-go-round ride was a popular attraction in the park. There was also a huge diving well with blue cement walls and high diving boards. The water was approx. 20 feet (6.1 m) deep in the well. Finally, there was a zip line that ran from the top of a wooden tower down to the water.

== Controversy ==
In 1995, Nelson Harvey Jr. died at Lake Ahoy. The details of his death are not publicly known.
