= Tidewater Arboretum =

Arboretum in Virginia Beach, Virginia, United States

Coordinates: 36.891940°N 76.179928°W

- Interactive map of Tidewater Arboretum
- Type: Arboretum
- Location: 1444 Diamond Springs Road, Virginia Beach, Virginia
- Area: 5 acres (2.0 ha)
- Website: Official website

Tidewater Arboretum, sometimes also called Hampton Roads Arboretum, is a 5-acre (2.0 ha) arboretum maintained by Virginia Tech's Hampton Roads Agricultural Research and Extension Center. It is located at 1444 Diamond Springs Road, Virginia Beach, Virginia, and open daily without charge.

The arboretum was established in 1975, and features small, woody plants suitable for urban gardens in the Southeastern Virginia climate. Each plant is identified by family, scientific name, and common name. The site also contains 12 theme gardens.

== See also ==
- List of botanical gardens and arboretums in Virginia
