= Alan P. Krasnoff =

American politician

Mayor of Chesapeake, Virginia
- In office July 1, 2008 – November 14, 2017
- Preceded by: Dalton S. Edge
- Succeeded by: Rick West (acting)

Personal details
- Born: Alan Paul Krasnoff
- Party: Republican

Alan Paul Krasnoff is a Republican former mayor of Chesapeake, Virginia. Chesapeake is located on the Eastern part of Virginia. Krasnoff had served as Mayor of Chesapeake from 2008 until 2017.
