= 2022 Chesapeake shooting =

Mass shooting in Virginia, U.S.

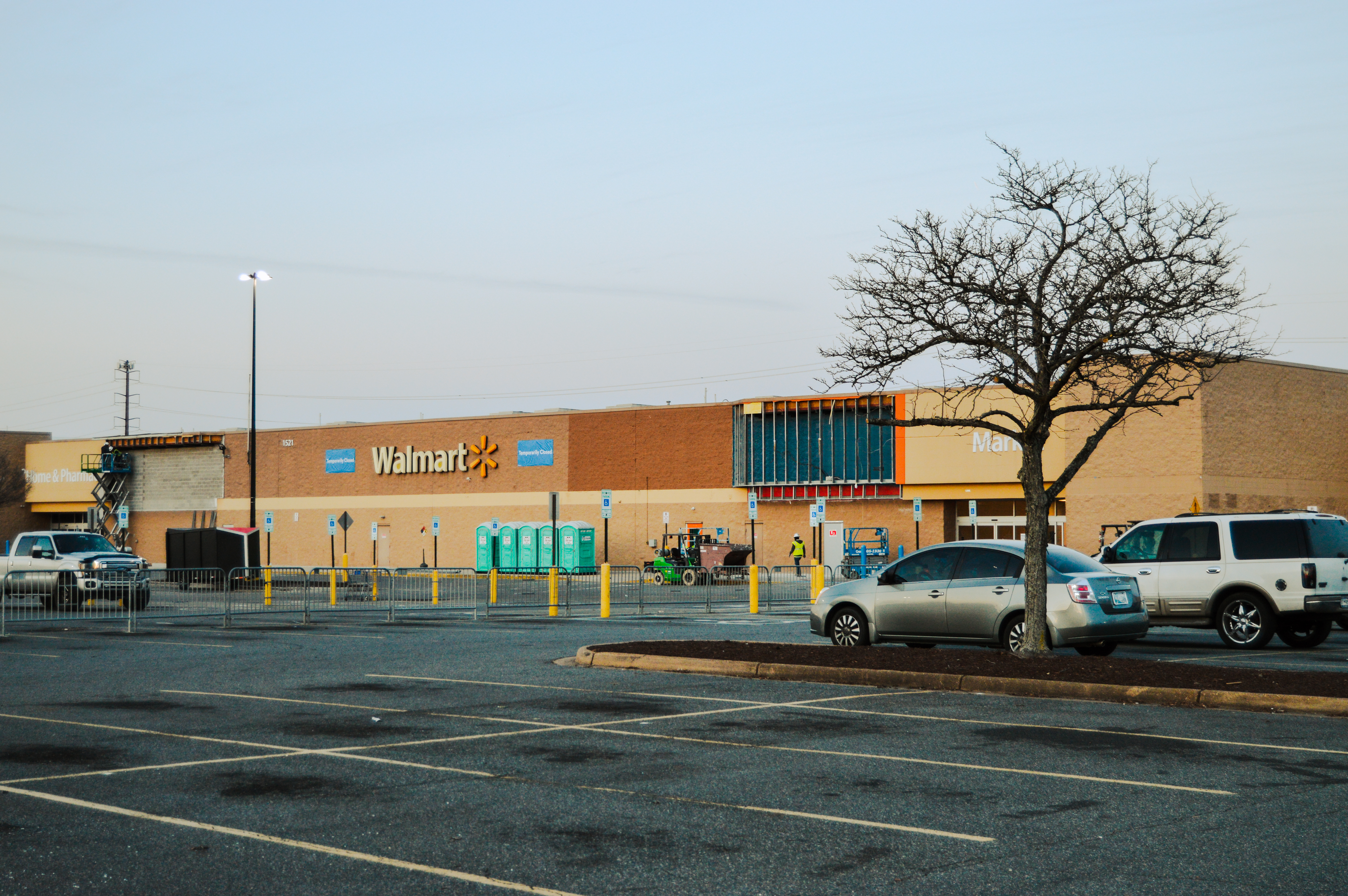
- The store following the shooting in January 2023. The store was closed for several months and received a full renovation.
- Location: 36°46′22″N 76°14′56″W; 1521 Sam's Circle, Chesapeake, Virginia, U.S.
- Date: November 22, 2022; 3 years ago 10:12 – 10:16 p.m. (EST UTC−05:00)
- Target: Coworkers at Walmart
- Attack type: Mass shooting, murder-suicide, mass murder
- Weapon: Taurus Armas 9mm semi-automatic pistol
- Deaths: 7 (including the perpetrator)
- Injuries: 4
- Perpetrator: Andre Marcus Bing
- Motive: Revenge-driven attack against co-worker harassment

On November 22, 2022, a mass shooting took place at a Walmart in Chesapeake, Virginia, United States. Andre Bing, a night-supervisor at the store, killed six co-workers and injured four others before committing suicide. Bing committed the attack out of perceived workplace harassment, with his suicide note additionally citing "social deficitis" and loneliness.

== Shooting ==
Bing purchased the 9mm semi-automatic pistol on the morning of the shooting, and practiced with shooting targets later found in his Chevrolet Silverado truck.

Police responded to reports of a shooting in the store at 10:12 pm. Bing shot a specific co-worker and then went to the breakroom to join an in-progress routine meeting about overnight responsibilities, but Bing interrupted and shot several others without speaking although he may have been laughing, and then fired at least ten shots walking the aisles. When he saw a co-worker hired five days earlier, he told her to run home and didn't target her.

Bing was targeting specific co-workers, and would continue shooting their prone bodies to ensure they were dead. He was carrying a paper list he'd made of names of employees he was targeting, and a similar list was found in his home. Six Walmart employees were killed: Randy Blevins, 70; Fernando Chavez-Barron, 16; Tyneka Johnson, 22; Lorenzo Gamble, 43; Brian Pendleton, 38; and Kellie Pyle, 52.

It took first responders 35–40 minutes to search the building. Officers discovered multiple victims in the building, including one near the entrance. The gunman was among the deceased, due to a self-inflicted gunshot wound to the head. The scene was declared safe by law enforcement about an hour after the first reports at 11:20 p.m.

== Perpetrator ==
Andre Marcus Bing (May 1, 1991 – November 22, 2022) was identified as the gunman in the shooting and was a night-shift manager at Walmart. He was a resident of Chesapeake who previously lived in Suffolk, Norfolk, and Virginia Beach as well as Queens, New York, and San Angelo, Texas. Bing started working with Walmart at the Chesapeake location twelve years earlier. Bing had no criminal record.

Bing's motive was characterized as revenge for perceived bullying by co-workers or a result of his failed romantic pursuits. He wrote a short suicide note in which he described feeling "led by Satan" in planning the shooting and explained how he had problems with women. He wrote in his death note: "My true intent was never to murder anyone, believe it or not, I was actually one of the most loving people in the world if you got to know me. I just wanted a wife that was equally yoked as I and obsessed over the thought; however, I didn't deserve a wife." An employee at the store alleged that he was planning on killing other Walmart managers. Walmart employees that had worked with Bing described him as difficult and known to be hostile to others.

== Aftermath ==
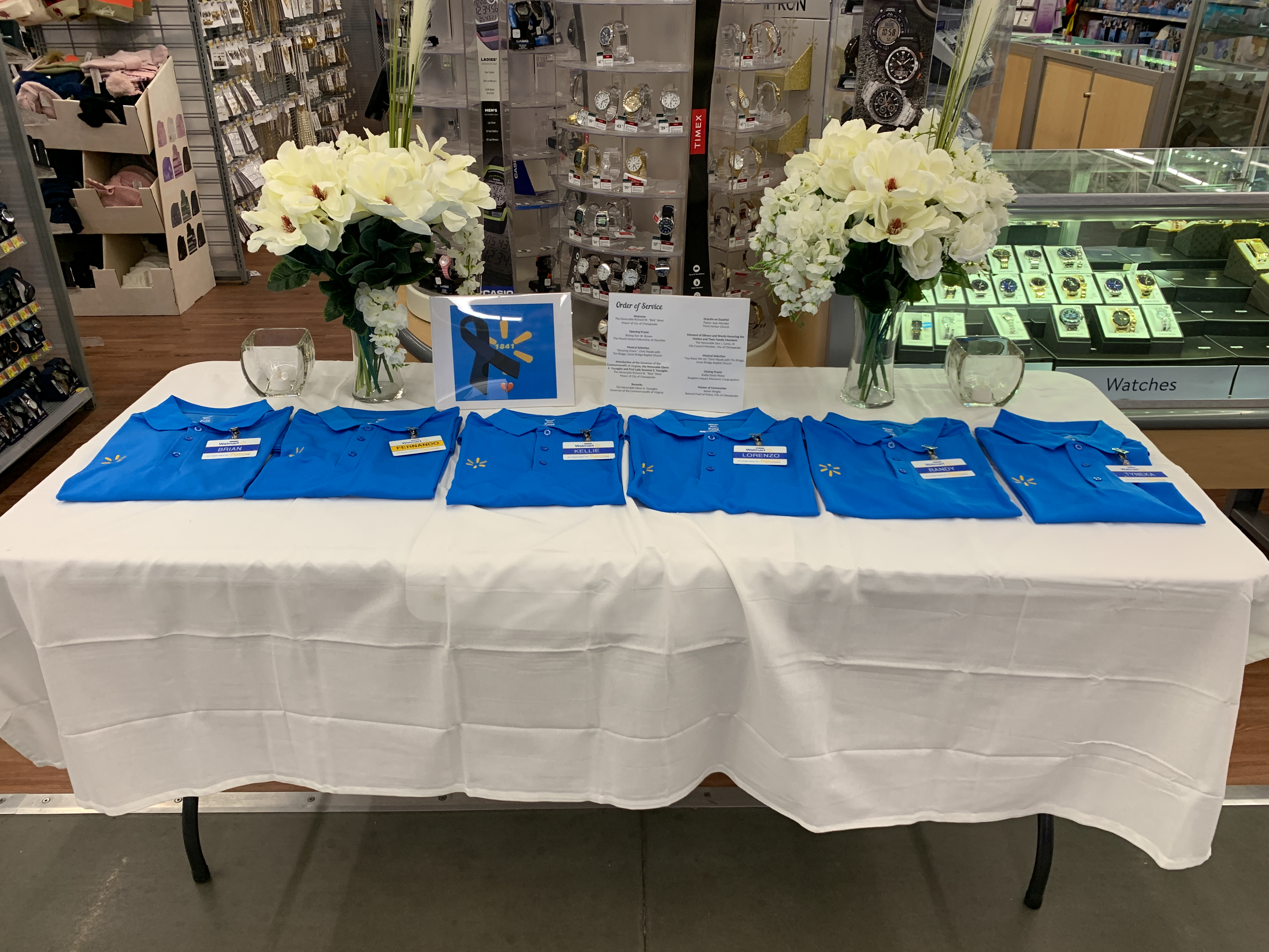
A memorial to the victims at Store #4623 in Newport News, Virginia.

A joint investigation between the Chesapeake Police Department, Virginia State Police and ATF was formed, including an immediate search of Bing's home.

Governor Glenn Youngkin said "our hearts break for the community of Chesapeake...Heinous acts of violence have no place in our communities.". Mayor Rick West also issued a statement the next morning offering his prayers to the families and thanks to the quick actions of first responders. Senator Mark Warner (D-VA) said he was sickened by the shooting. Virginia state senator Louise Lucas of Virginia's 18th Senate district, which includes Chesapeake, said she was "heartbroken that America's latest mass shooting took place in a Walmart in my district". President Joe Biden shared his condolences and called for gun reform in the U.S.

Survivors filed two $50 million lawsuits against the company via Morgan & Morgan law firm, alleging Walmart neglected safety in light of complaints of Bing's behavior. On February 7, 2024, one of those lawsuits was dismissed. The store was closed as a result of the shootings. Walmart reopened it on April 19, 2023, with significant changes to its design. There was also a memorial space to honor to victims and provide comfort for the survivors. As of October 2026, The memorial is no longer there.

== See also ==
- List of shootings in Virginia
- List of mass shootings in the United States in 2022
