= Port Folio Weekly =

- Type: Weekly newspaper
- Format: Broadsheet, Tabloid, Digital-only
- Founded: 1983; 43 years ago
- Ceased publication: 2009; 17 years ago
- Headquarters: Virginia, United States
- Website: Required, link like so: www.pilotonline.com; see below

Port Folio Weekly was a publication - first print, then online - serving the Hampton Roads area of Virginia. First published in 1983, the publication was owned by Landmark Communications.

For 26 years, Port Folio Weekly served as the region's weekly alternative newspaper, using the moniker, "The Alternative Voice of the Seven Cities." The paper included political commentary, arts and entertainment features, restaurant reviews and listings, and local news. In early 2009, Landmark Communications announced it would suspend the print version of Port Folio but maintain an online publication.

Tom Robotham served as editor-in-chief for the last 10 years of the newspaper's run, stepping down six months before the last issue went to print. Robotham said the higher-ups at Landmark Communications disliked his left-leaning political views, which he often expressed in his editor's note. The publisher said the newspaper was just in need of a change.

After transitioning to a web-based publication, Port Folio Weekly changed its motto to "The Voice of the Seven Cities," instead of "The Alternative Voice of the Seven Cities." The online publication also used content from its sister publications owned by Landmark, including Tidewater Parent, The Flagship, and Inside Business. As of July 2019, the website redirects to the website for The Virginian-Pilot newspaper.
