= Chesapeake Arboretum =

Arboretum in Chesapeake, Virginia, United States

Coordinates: 36°44′37.3″N 76°14′12.1″W

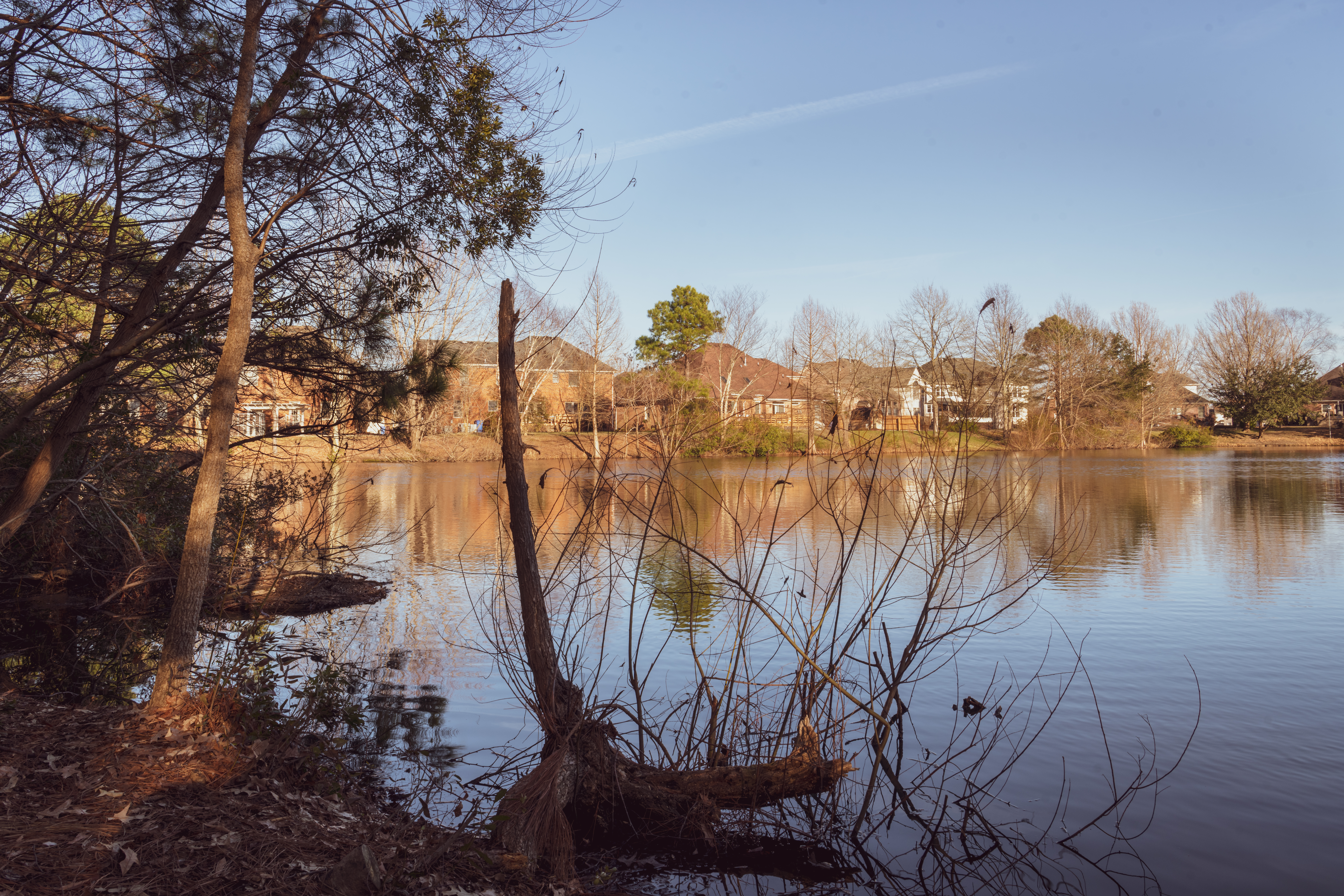
- The shore of Lake Hughes
- Interactive map of Chesapeake Arboretum
- Type: Arboretum
- Location: 624 Oak Grove Road, Chesapeake, Virginia
- Area: 51 acres (21 ha)
- Website: Official website

Chesapeake Arboretum (51 acres) is a non-profit arboretum located at 624 Oak Grove Road, Chesapeake, Virginia and is open daily without charge.

The arboretum was established in 1996, and currently consists of a mature hardwood forest with good trail system, farmhouse, and theme and demonstration gardens.

The Chesapeake Arboretum trail system is approximately 45 acres and is some 3.5 miles (5.6 km) in total length.

A perennial stream, Starr Run, runs through the trail system and is crossed by 11 bridges.

== See also ==
- List of botanical gardens in the United States
