= Murder of Jiansheng Chen =

2017 shooting in Chesapeake, Virginia, U.S.

- Date: January 26, 2017
- Location: Chesapeake, Virginia, U.S.
- Deaths: Jiansheng Chen
- Accused: Johnathan Cromwell
- Charges: Second-degree murder
- Verdict: Guilty of second-degree murder and using a firearm to commit murder
- Sentence: 30 years in prison

Jiansheng Chen
- Traditional Chinese: 陳建生
- Simplified Chinese: 陈建生
Transcriptions
Standard Mandarin
- Hanyu Pinyin: Chén Jiànshēng

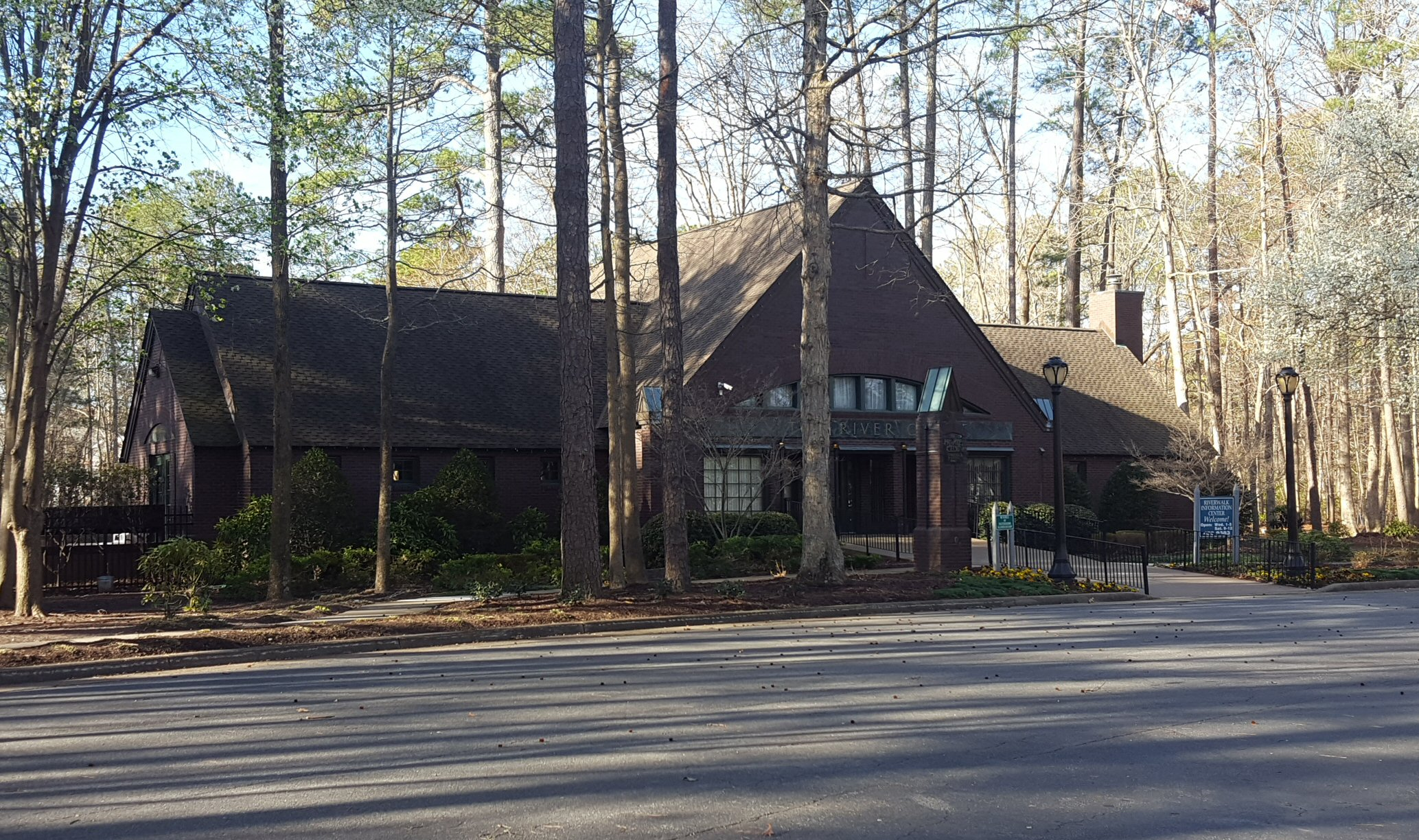
The River Walk clubhouse in Chesapeake, Virginia. Chen was shot at the clubhouse's parking lot driveway entrance.

On the night of January 26, 2017, Jiansheng Chen, a 60-year-old grandfather, was shot dead by a security guard in Chesapeake, Virginia. Chen, a Chinese immigrant, had been playing the augmented reality mobile game, Pokémon Go, in a minivan at the community clubhouse's parking lot when the security guard, 21-year-old Johnathan Cromwell, fired 10 shots, of which five hit Chen.

On February 16, 2017, Cromwell was charged with second-degree murder. He was later convicted and sentenced to 30 years in prison on June 24, 2019.

== Background ==
Chen was born in Guantou, part of Lianjiang County, Fujian. He dropped out of sixth grade at 14 to work as a miner. Around 1989, he immigrated to the United States to work as a cook in New York, later opening his own restaurant in the Hampton Roads metropolitan area of Virginia. Chen later brought over several relatives by paying for their green card fees.

Cromwell was employed by Citywide Protective Services. Prior to the shooting, he had expelled one of Chen's roommates from the club's premises and it was alleged that Cromwell had been stalking Chen in the past.

== Aftermath ==
According to a notice given to the residents of River Walk community, the contract for the patrol services is for unarmed patrols.

After the shooting, the River Walk Community Association suspended and then terminated their contract with the security company who provided the security guard.

On February 6, 2017, Andrew M. Sacks, an attorney representing Citywide Protection Services, which employed the security guard who shot Chen, held a news conference. According to Sacks, Chen repeatedly attempted to hit the security guard with his blue minivan; in response, the security guard fired "in reasonable fear for his life and safety". The evidence also confirmed that Chen had been in the same place 10 days earlier, and, as specified by Sacks, was warned that he was trespassing on private property and instructed not to return. More than 60 people protested in support of Chen outside Sacks' office in downtown Norfolk during the news conference.

It was reported that Chen played Pokémon Go, "as a way to bond with his nieces, nephews, grand-nephews, grand-nieces, nephews-in-law, nieces-in-law, and grandchildren." According to Greg Sandler, an attorney representing Chen's family, Chen was playing Pokémon Go at the time when he was shot. Police said the security guard fired through more than one of the van's windows. The security guard fired several shots through the side window and, "then moved to the front of the van and fired through the windshield."

On February 14, 2017, three U.S. Representatives, Donald McEachin (VA-04), Bobby Scott (VA-03), and Grace Meng (NY-06), issued a joint statement concerning the death of Jiansheng Chen. They stated they, "must know how a game of Pokémon Go turned into a fatal shooting."

== Legal proceedings ==
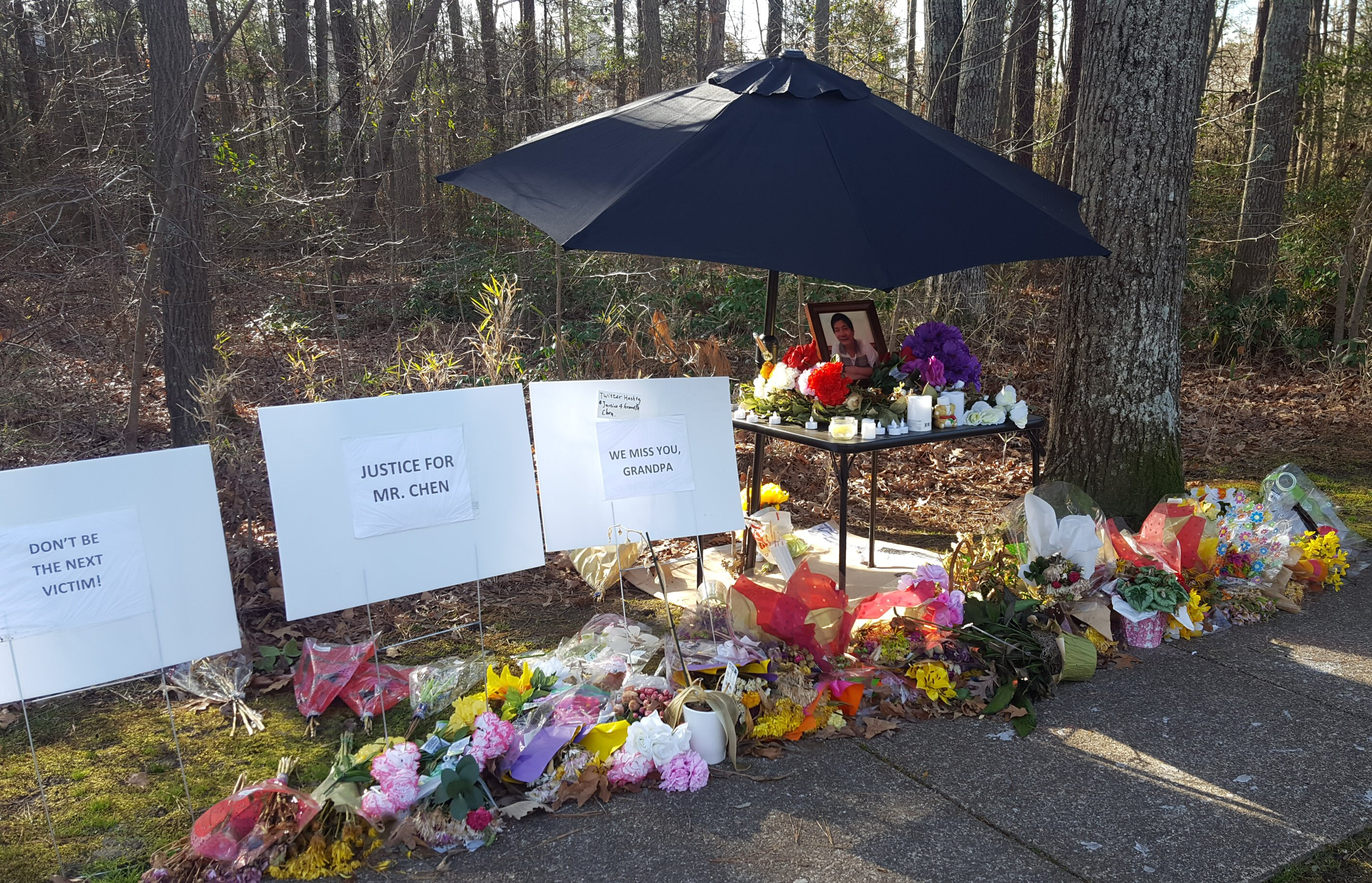
Memorial for Jiansheng Chen near the River Walk clubhouse

On February 16, 2017, based on a news release from the Commonwealth's Attorney Nancy Parr, Johnathan Cromwell, the 21-year-old security guard of Virginia Beach, was charged with second-degree murder and use of a firearm. The news release also said Chen's van turned into the parking area of the River Walk clubhouse on January 26, 2017, around 11:00 p.m. Then "Mr. Cromwell confronted Mr. Chen by stopping his vehicle directly in front of Mr. Chen's. Mr. Chen backed up and turned his vehicle around to the point that it was at the entrance of the driveway facing River Walk Parkway when he was shot. Mr. Cromwell had exited his car and did say "stop" before he fired his weapon. Mr. Chen has gunshot entry wounds to his upper body area. The gunshot entry wounds are one (1) in his left upper arm and four (4) in his upper left chest."

Cromwell turned himself in the afternoon of February 16, 2017. At a bond hearing on February 27, Cromwell was denied bond by Judge Stephen Telfeyan.

According to the lawsuit, the security guard has a history of aggression as he had "previously drawn and brandished his weapon toward unarmed residents and guests of the River Walk neighborhood". He would go beyond the boundaries of his duties and use excessive force, which resulted in a previous employer firing Cromwell.

The second-degree murder charge was upgraded to first-degree murder in July 2017. Following the attorney switch, a judge granted Cromwell a six-month continuance from his original trial date of September 26, 2017, WAVY-TV reported. Sacks said the trial was expected to begin on March 8, 2018, and to last five days.

On June 29, 2018, court records show the jury trial was scheduled for February 19, 2019. A homicide detective who investigated the shooting testified in court on February 21, 2019, that "Cromwell wanted to play a video of himself qualifying for a shooting certification, but the detective said he did not want to see it". Then, Cromwell continued to ask, "How was my grouping?" referring to the accuracy of shots he had fired at Chen. Cromwell reportedly appeared in court wearing headphones every day since he was having trouble hearing the proceedings, which some writers speculated could have implied excessive shooting that can cause ear damage.

On March 1, 2019, a jury found Johnathan Cromwell, 23, guilty of second-degree murder and using a firearm to commit murder. On June 24, 2019, a Judge sentenced Cromwell to 30 years in prison. Sacks said that they intend to appeal the conviction.

Chen's family has also filed a $5.35 million wrongful death lawsuit against Cromwell, his employer, Citywide Protection Services, and the River Walk Community Association in the Virginia Beach Circuit Court. The family was paid $1.5 million. Cromwell and Citywide Protection Services agreed to pay $1.35 million, River Walk Community Association paid the remaining $150,000. The defendants continue to deny any liability in the incident.
