= Williamsburg Botanical Garden =

Botanical garden in Williamsburg, Virginia

Coordinates: 37°19′10.4″N 76°47′56.9″W

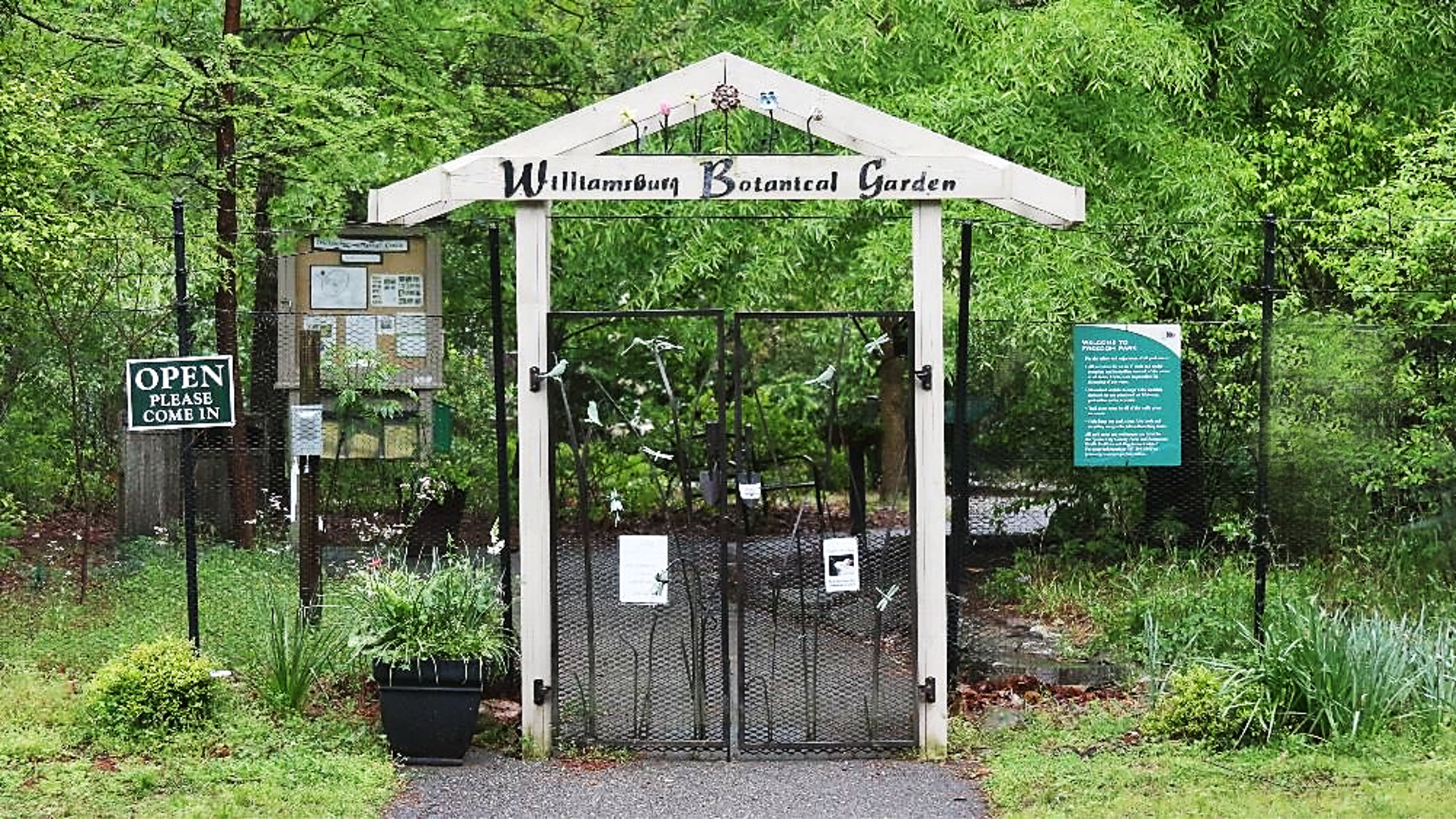
- Main Entrance
- Interactive map of Williamsburg Botanical Garden
- Type: Botanical garden
- Location: Freedom Park, 5537 Centerville Road, Williamsburg, Virginia
- Area: 2 acres (0.81 ha)
- Website: williamsburgbotanicalgarden.org

The Williamsburg Botanical Garden is a 501(c)(3) non-profit botanical garden in Williamsburg, Virginia.

The Garden's board was established in 2002 and the Garden was dedicated in 2006. The Garden occupies a 2-acre site within Freedom Park at 5537 Centerville Road, and includes more than 2,000 trees, shrubs, and other plantings in a butterfly garden, herb garden, native plant garden, perennial border, pinewoods and fernery, wetlands, and wildflower meadow.

== See also ==
- List of botanical gardens in the United States
