= Murder of Rodney Pocceschi =

2003 murder of an American police officer

- Pocceschi
- Location: Virginia Beach, Virginia, US
- Date: June 23, 2003
- Attack type: Shooting
- Deaths: 2 (including the perpetrator)
- Perpetrator: Lekeith Speller

On June 23, 2003, Virginia Beach police officer Rodney Pocceschi conducted a traffic stop on two men for speeding. Unbeknownst to Pocceschi, the two men had earlier robbed an IHOP, and when conducting the traffic stop, one of the men, Lekeith Speller, opened fire on Pocceschi. Pocceschi returned fire, killing Speller, but suffered fatal injuries.

Following Pocceschi's death, his sisters co-founded Fallen Officers Remembered, which provided scholarships to criminal justice students and bulletproof vests to officers who did not already have one.

== Background ==
=== Rodney Pocceschi ===
Pocceschi, a Pennsylvania native, was a 1992 graduate of Bloomsburg University, with a degree in criminal science. After college he served with the Bloomsburg University Police Department and the Nescopeck Police Department. He joined the Virginia Beach Police Department on August 2, 1999.

In 2001, Pocceschi received a special commendation for helping with a neighborhood project that focused on crime-ridden housing projects. At the time of the incident, he had just recently joined the department's special operations branch.

== Murder ==
On the evening of June 23, 2003, Christina Marie Tatem, an 18-year-old IHOP employee, let two men into the back door of the restaurant: her boyfriend and convicted felon LeKeith Devon Speller, 21, and his accomplice Shawn Anthony Zhe. The three put on masks and robbed the restaurant, which was open, though no customers were present. The two men fled and at 3:24am were pulled over for speeding by Pocceschi.

According to police reports, during the traffic stop Lekeith Devon Speller, 21, got out of the car and pulled a gun and shot at Pocceschi, who fired back. Both were wounded and collapsed; Zhe remained on the scene. A teenager saw Pocceschi lying in the road and stopped to help. He flagged down a K-9 officer, who with a second officer rendered CPR. Pocceschi died in the hospital at 4:05 a.m; this was the first felonious killing of a Virginia Beach police officer in 22 years.

Speller was pronounced dead at the scene. It was discovered that he was a six-time convicted felon, who had convictions for violent crimes, and was at the time wanted for assaulting a police officer, burglary, grand larceny, and probation violation. He was also the suspected accomplice in a pair of fast-food robberies and one murder only a month before Pocceschi's killing.

Pocceschi was survived by a wife and a nine-month old child. A memorial fund yielded $44,000.

== Aftermath ==
Following his death, Pocceschi's sisters, Jaclyn Pocceschi-Mosley and Gina Pocceschi-Boyle, founded Fallen Officers Remembered, an organization that engages in charitable activities, such as providing scholarships for criminal justice students, and providing bulletproof vests to police officers who do not already have them.

A memorial was created by a well-wisher on Dam Neck Road in Virginia Beach, the same road that Pocceschi was shot on. On June 21, 2020, on Father's Day, Pocceschi's memorial was vandalized. The memorial was repaired by community members.
