= Chesapeake, Virginia =

- Independent city
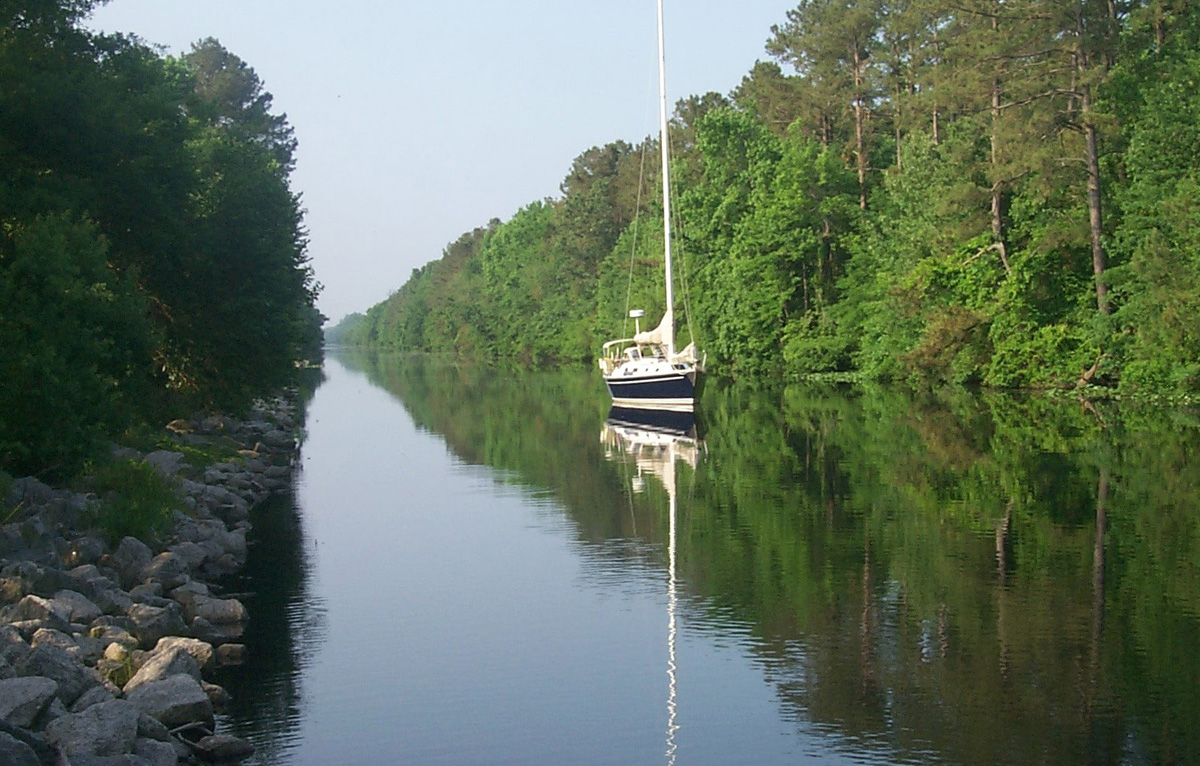
- Great Dismal Swamp Canal

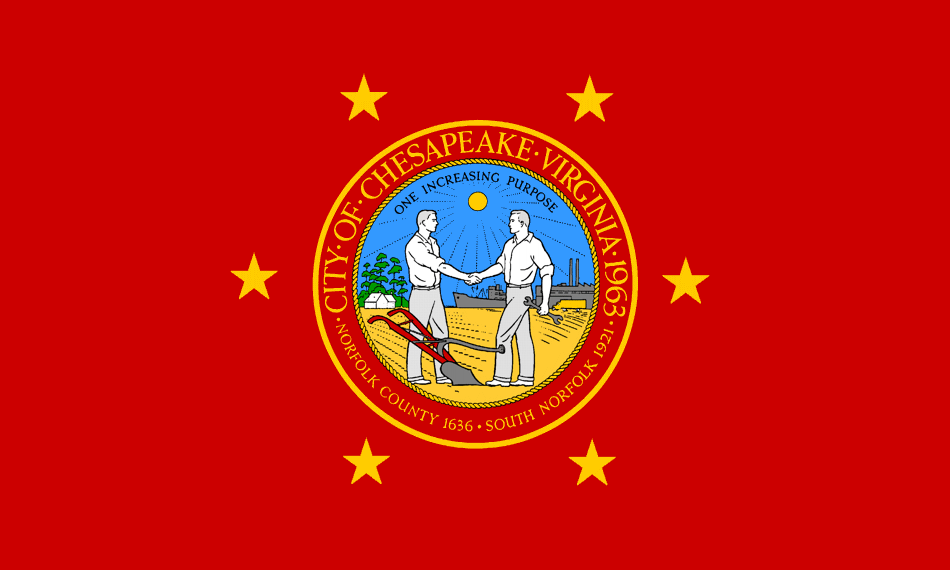
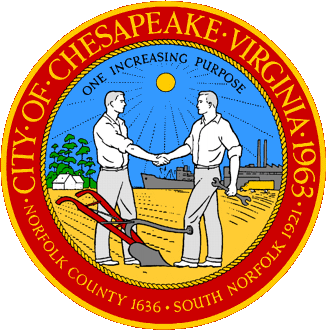
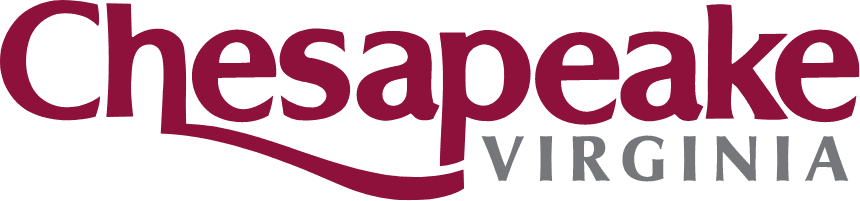
- Flag Seal Wordmark
- Motto: "One Increasing Purpose"
- Interactive map of Chesapeake, Virginia
- Location within Virginia Location within the United States
- Coordinates: 36°42′51″N 76°14′18″W
- Country: United States
- State: Virginia
- Founded: 1963 (1919 as South Norfolk, 1634 as Norfolk County, Virginia)

Government
  - Type: Mayor–council–manager
  - Mayor: Rick West (R)

Area
  - Independent city: 350.95 sq mi (908.95 km^{2})
  - Land: 338.46 sq mi (876.60 km^{2})
  - Water: 12.49 sq mi (32.35 km^{2}) 3.6%
- Elevation: 16 ft (4.9 m)

Population (2020)
  - Independent city: 249,422
  - Estimate (2025): 255,332 ▲
  - Rank: 92nd in the United States; 2nd in Virginia
  - Density: 736.94/sq mi (284.53/km^{2})
  - Metro: 1,799,674
- Time zone: UTC−5 (EST)
  - Summer (DST): UTC−4 (EDT)
- ZIP codes: 23320-23328
- Area codes: 757 and 948
- FIPS code: 51-16000
- GNIS feature ID: 1496841
- Website: www.cityofchesapeake.net

Chesapeake is an independent city in Virginia, United States. At the 2020 census, the population was 249,422, making it the second-most populous city in Virginia, the tenth largest in the Mid-Atlantic, and the 92nd-most populous city in the United States.

Chesapeake is located in the Hampton Roads metropolitan area. One of the cities in the South Hampton Roads, Chesapeake was organized in 1963 by voter referendums approving the political consolidation of the city of South Norfolk with the remnants of the former Norfolk County, which dated to 1691. (Much of the territory of the county had been annexed by other cities.) Chesapeake is the second-largest city by land area in the Commonwealth of Virginia, and the 17th-largest in the United States.

Chesapeake is a diverse city in which a few urban areas are located; it also has many square miles of protected farmland, forests, and wetlands, including a substantial portion of the Great Dismal Swamp National Wildlife Refuge. Extending from the rural border with North Carolina to the harbor area of Hampton Roads adjacent to the cities of Norfolk, Portsmouth, Suffolk, and Virginia Beach, Chesapeake is located on the Atlantic Intracoastal Waterway. It has miles of waterfront industrial, commercial and residential property. In 2011, Chesapeake was named the 21st best city in the United States by Bloomberg Businessweek. Chesapeake is home to the international headquarters of Dollar Tree.

== History ==
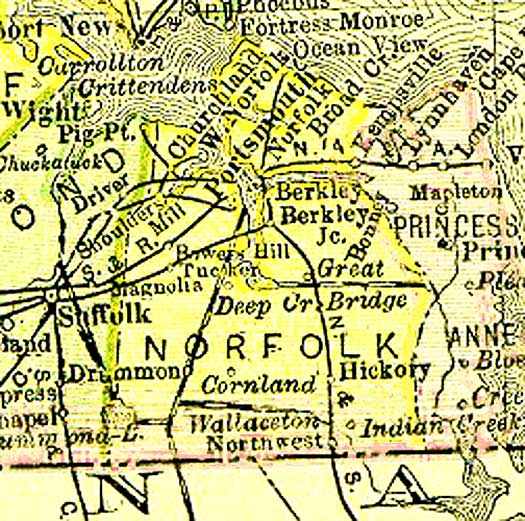
Norfolk County, Virginia (from 1895 map), existed from 1691 to 1963, now extinct

In 1963, the new independent city of Chesapeake was created when the former independent city of South Norfolk consolidated with Norfolk County. The consolidation was approved, and the new name selected by the voters of each community by referendum and authorized by the Virginia General Assembly.

Formed in 1691 in the Virginia Colony, Norfolk County had originally included essentially all the area which became the towns and later cities of Norfolk, Portsmouth, and South Norfolk. Its area was reduced after 1871 as these cities added territory through annexations. Becoming an independent city was a method for the former county to stabilize borders with neighbors, as cities could not annex territory from each other.

The relatively small city of South Norfolk had become an incorporated town within Norfolk County in 1919 and became an independent city in 1922. Its residents wanted to make a change to put their jurisdiction on a more equal footing in other aspects with the much larger cities of Norfolk and Portsmouth. In addition, by the late 1950s, although immune from annexation by the bigger cities, South Norfolk was close to losing all the county land adjoining it to the city of Norfolk in another annexation suit.

The consolidation that resulted in the city of Chesapeake was part of a wave of changes in the structure of local government in southeastern Virginia which took place between 1952 and 1975.

The Chesapeake region was among the first areas settled in the state's colonial era, when settlement started from the coast. Along Chesapeake's segment of the Intracoastal Waterway, where the Great Bridge locks marks the transition between the Southern Branch Elizabeth River and the Chesapeake and Albemarle Canal, lies the site of the Battle of Great Bridge. Fought on December 9, 1775, in the early days of the American Revolutionary War, the battle resulted in the removal of Lord Dunmore and all vestiges of English Government from the Colony and Dominion of Virginia.

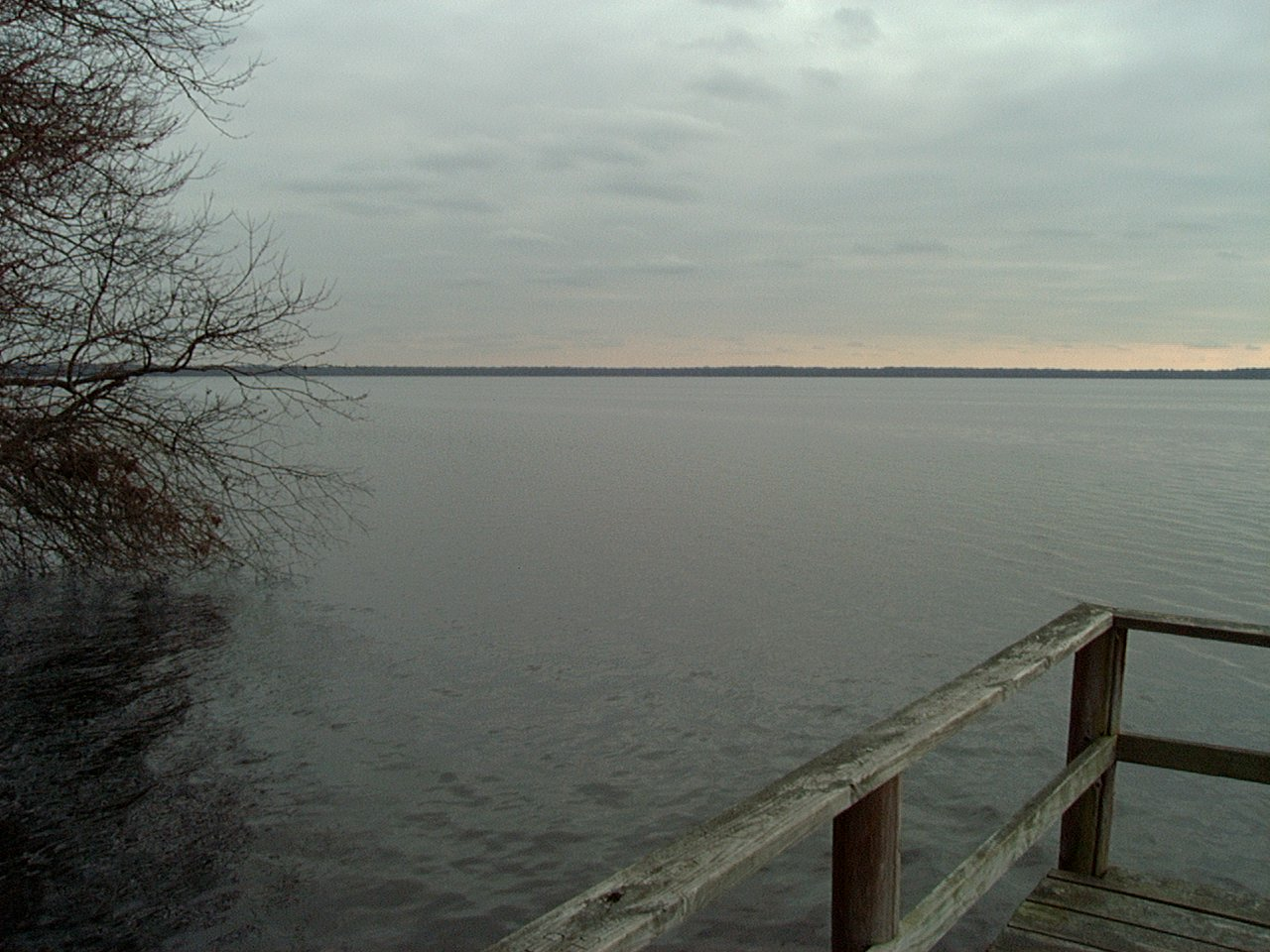
Photograph of Lake Drummond, Great Dismal Swamp National Wildlife Refuge, Virginia

Until the late 1980s and early 1990s, much of Chesapeake was either suburban or rural, serving as a bedroom community of the adjacent cities of Norfolk and Virginia Beach with residents commuting to these locations. Beginning in the late 1980s and accelerating in the 1990s, however, Chesapeake saw significant growth, attracting numerous and significant industries and businesses of its own. This explosive growth quickly led to strains on the municipal infrastructure, ranging from intrusion of saltwater into the city's water supply to congested roads and schools.

Chesapeake made national headlines in 2003 when, under a court-ordered change of venue, the community hosted the first trial of alleged Beltway sniper Lee Boyd Malvo for shootings in 2002. A jury convicted him of murder but spared him a potential death sentence; it chose a sentence of "life in prison without parole" for the young man, who was 17 years old at the time of the crime spree. A jury in neighboring Virginia Beach convicted his older partner John Allen Muhammad and sentenced him to death for another of the attacks.

On November 22, 2022, a mass shooting occurred in a Walmart off of Battlefield Boulevard in Chesapeake. Seven people were killed, including the gunman who committed suicide, and four others were injured.

== Geography ==
Chesapeake is located at 36°46′2″N 76°17′14″W (36.767398, -76.287405).

According to the United States Census Bureau, the city has a total area of 350.95 square miles (909.0 km^{2}), of which 338.51 square miles (876.7 km^{2}) is land and 12.44 square miles (32.2 km^{2}) (2.9%) is water.

The northeastern part of the Great Dismal Swamp is located in Chesapeake.

=== Environment ===
Chesapeake is one of the larger cities in Virginia and the nation in terms of land area. This poses challenges to city leaders in supporting infrastructure to serve this area. In addition, the city has many historically and geographically distinct communities. City leaders are faced with conflicts between development of residential, commercial and industrial areas and preservation of virgin forest and wetlands. Within the city limits in the southwestern section is a large portion of the Great Dismal Swamp.

=== Adjacent counties and cities ===
- Portsmouth, Virginia (north)
- Norfolk, Virginia (north)
- Virginia Beach, Virginia (east)
- Currituck County, North Carolina (south)
- Camden County, North Carolina (south)
- Suffolk, Virginia (west)

=== Communities ===
Chesapeake consists of six boroughs: South Norfolk, Butts Road, Deep Creek, Pleasant Grove, Western Branch and Washington. One of the boroughs, South Norfolk, used to be its own independent city and consolidated the surrounding portions of Norfolk County (extinct) into the City of Chesapeake.

=== Climate ===
The climate in this area is characterized by hot, humid summers and generally mild to cool winters. According to the Köppen Climate Classification system, Chesapeake has a humid subtropical climate, abbreviated "Cfa" on climate maps.

Climate data for Chesapeake, Virginia (1980–2010)
Month	Jan	Feb	Mar	Apr	May	Jun	Jul	Aug	Sep	Oct	Nov	Dec	Year
Mean daily maximum °F (°C)	49.7 (9.8)	52.7 (11.5)	60.6 (15.9)	70.0 (21.1)	77.5 (25.3)	85.2 (29.6)	88.7 (31.5)	86.7 (30.4)	81.1 (27.3)	72.0 (22.2)	62.9 (17.2)	53.2 (11.8)	70.0 (21.1)
Mean daily minimum °F (°C)	30.3 (−0.9)	32.5 (0.3)	38.6 (3.7)	47.0 (8.3)	55.9 (13.3)	65.0 (18.3)	69.5 (20.8)	67.9 (19.9)	61.8 (16.6)	50.4 (10.2)	41.5 (5.3)	33.5 (0.8)	49.5 (9.7)
Average precipitation inches (mm)	3.6 (91)	3.4 (86)	4.0 (100)	3.5 (89)	3.9 (99)	4.1 (100)	5.3 (130)	5.3 (130)	4.9 (120)	3.5 (89)	3.3 (84)	3.6 (91)	48.4 (1,209)
Source: USA.com

== Demographics ==
Historical population
Census	Pop.	Note	%±
1790	14,524		—
1800	19,419		33.7%
1810	22,872		17.8%
1820	23,936		4.7%
1830	24,806		3.6%
1840	27,569		11.1%
1850	33,036		19.8%
1860	36,227		9.7%
1870	46,702		28.9%
1880	58,657		25.6%
1890	77,038		31.3%
1900	50,780		−34.1%
1910	52,744		3.9%
1920	57,358		8.7%
1930	30,082		−47.6%
1940	35,828		19.1%
1950	99,537		177.8%
1960	51,612		−48.1%
1970	89,580		73.6%
1980	114,486		27.8%
1990	151,976		32.7%
2000	199,184		31.1%
2010	222,209		11.6%
2020	249,422		12.2%
2025 (est.)	255,332	▲	2.4%
U.S. Decennial Census; 1790-1960 1900-1990; 1990-2000

=== Racial and ethnic composition ===
Chesapeake city, Virginia – Racial and ethnic composition Note: the US Census treats Hispanic/Latino as an ethnic category. This table excludes Latinos from the racial categories and assigns them to a separate category. Hispanics/Latinos may be of any race.
Race / Ethnicity (NH = Non-Hispanic)	Pop 1980	Pop 1990	Pop 2000	Pop 2010	Pop 2020	% 1980	% 1990	% 2000	% 2010	% 2020
White alone (NH)	80,809	106,310	131,200	134,251	135,679	70.58%	69.95%	65.87%	60.42%	54.40%
Black or African American alone (NH)	31,373	41,443	56,442	65,204	70,885	27.40%	27.27%	28.34%	29.34%	28.42%
Native American or Alaska Native alone (NH)	248	423	722	720	731	0.22%	0.28%	0.36%	0.32%	0.29%
Asian alone (NH)	958	1,809	3,638	6,289	8,868	0.84%	1.19%	1.83%	2.83%	3.56%
Native Hawaiian or Pacific Islander alone (NH)	x	x	92	147	312	x	x	0.05%	0.07%	0.13%
Other race alone (NH)	39	78	251	266	1,223	0.03%	0.05%	0.13%	0.12%	0.49%
Mixed race or Multiracial (NH)	x	x	2,763	5,626	13,900	x	x	1.39%	2.53%	5.57%
Hispanic or Latino (any race)	1,059	1,913	4,076	9,706	17,824	0.93%	1.26%	2.05%	4.37%	7.15%
Total	114,486	151,976	199,184	222,209	249,422	100.00%	100.00%	100.00%	100.00%	100.00%

=== 2020 census ===
As of the 2020 census, Chesapeake had a population of 249,422. The median age was 38.0 years. 24.1% of residents were under the age of 18 and 14.5% of residents were 65 years of age or older. For every 100 females there were 94.8 males, and for every 100 females age 18 and over there were 92.0 males age 18 and over.

92.3% of residents lived in urban areas, while 7.7% lived in rural areas.

There were 91,162 households in Chesapeake, of which 36.1% had children under the age of 18 living in them. Of all households, 52.5% were married-couple households, 14.9% were households with a male householder and no spouse or partner present, and 27.4% were households with a female householder and no spouse or partner present. About 21.6% of all households were made up of individuals and 8.7% had someone living alone who was 65 years of age or older.

There were 94,829 housing units, of which 3.9% were vacant. The homeowner vacancy rate was 1.3% and the rental vacancy rate was 4.8%.

Racial composition as of the 2020 census
Race	Number	Percent
White	139,573	56.0%
Black or African American	72,268	29.0%
American Indian and Alaska Native	1,174	0.5%
Asian	9,057	3.6%
Native Hawaiian and Other Pacific Islander	377	0.2%
Some other race	6,807	2.7%
Two or more races	20,166	8.1%
Hispanic or Latino (of any race)	17,824	7.1%

Age distribution in Chesapeake

=== 2010 census ===
As of the census of 2010, there were 222,209 people, 69,900 households, and 54,172 families residing in the city. The population density was 584.6 inhabitants per square mile (225.7/km^{2}). There were 72,672 housing units at an average density of 213.3 units per square mile (82.4 units/km^{2}). The racial makeup of the city was 62.6% White, 29.8% Black or African American, 0.4% Native American, 2.9% Asian, 0.1% Pacific Islander, 1.2% from other races, and 3.0% from two or more races. 4.4% of the population were Hispanics or Latinos of any race.

There were 69,900 households, out of which 41.0% had children under the age of 18 living with them, 59.7% were married couples living together, 14.0% had a female householder with no husband present, and 22.5% were non-families. 18.0% of all households were made up of individuals, and 5.9% had someone living alone who was 65 years of age or older. The average household size was 2.79 and the average family size was 3.17.

The age distribution was: 28.8% under the age of 18, 8.2% from 18 to 24, 32.3% from 25 to 44, 21.7% from 45 to 64, and 9.0% who were 65 years of age or older. The median age was 35 years. For every 100 females, there were 94.4 males. For every 100 females aged 18 and over, there were 91.0 males.

The median income for a household in the city was $50,743, and the median income for a family was $56,302. Males had a median income of $39,204 versus $26,391 for females. The per capita income for the city was $20,949. About 6.1% of families and 7.3% of the population were below the poverty line, including 9.7% of those under age 18 and 9.0% of those age 65 or over.

== Economy ==
=== Top employers ===
As of 2025, Chesapeake's 2025 Comprehensive Annual Financial Report the top ten employers in the city are:

#	Employer	# of Employees
1	Chesapeake City Public Schools	6,977
2	City of Chesapeake	4,012
3	Chesapeake Regional Medical Center	2,058
4	Walmart	1,829
5	Dollar Tree	1,826
6	Amazon.com Services	1,624
7	Sentara Healthcare	911
8	Food Lion	807
9	USAA	799
10	Cox Communications	753

=== Military ===
Chesapeake is home to two Navy bases:

- Northwest Annex, located in the Hickory area
- NALF Fentress

== Points of interest ==
- Chesapeake Arboretum
- Chesapeake and Albemarle Canal
- Dismal Swamp Canal

== Media ==
Chesapeake's daily newspaper is The Virginian-Pilot. Other papers include the Port Folio Weekly, the New Journal and Guide, and the Hampton Roads Business Journal. Hampton Roads Magazine serves as a bi-monthly regional magazine for Chesapeake and the Hampton Roads area. Hampton Roads Times serves as an online magazine for all the Hampton Roads cities and counties. Chesapeake is served by a variety of radio stations on the AM and FM dials, with towers located around the Hampton Roads area. Chesapeake is also served by several television stations. The Hampton Roads designated market area (DMA) is the 42nd largest in the U.S. with 712,790 homes (0.64% of the total U.S.). The major network television affiliates are WTKR-TV 3 (CBS), WAVY 10 (NBC), WVEC-TV 13 (ABC), WGNT 27 (CW), WTVZ 33 (MyNetworkTV), WVBT 43 (Fox), and WPXV 49 (ION Television). The Public Broadcasting Service station is WHRO-TV 15. Chesapeake residents also can receive independent stations, such as WSKY broadcasting on channel 4 from the Outer Banks of North Carolina and WGBS-LD broadcasting on channel 11 from Hampton. Chesapeake is served by Cox Communications which provides LNC 5, a local 24-hour cable news television network.

== Politics ==
Chesapeake is a competitive region. It has voted for the winner of the electoral college in every presidential election since 1972, except in 1992, 1996, and 2024.

United States presidential election results for Chesapeake, Virginia
Year	Republican		Democratic		Third party(ies)	
Year	No.	%	No.	%	No.	%
1964	9,038	48.54%	9,532	51.19%	51	0.27%
1968	6,234	25.18%	6,843	27.64%	11,683	47.18%
1972	17,722	67.95%	7,289	27.95%	1,069	4.10%
1976	12,851	39.96%	17,651	54.89%	1,655	5.15%
1980	17,888	48.47%	17,155	46.49%	1,861	5.04%
1984	27,542	61.64%	16,740	37.46%	402	0.90%
1988	29,738	60.87%	18,828	38.54%	289	0.59%
1992	28,909	46.73%	23,495	37.98%	9,464	15.30%
1996	29,251	46.66%	28,713	45.80%	4,722	7.53%
2000	39,684	53.21%	33,578	45.02%	1,323	1.77%
2004	52,283	57.11%	38,744	42.32%	514	0.56%
2008	52,625	48.94%	53,994	50.22%	902	0.84%
2012	53,900	48.81%	55,052	49.85%	1,473	1.33%
2016	54,047	47.95%	52,627	46.69%	6,031	5.35%
2020	58,180	45.77%	66,377	52.22%	2,551	2.01%
2024	60,550	47.30%	65,399	51.09%	2,052	1.60%

== Education ==
Chesapeake City Public Schools is the local school district.

The Chesapeake Public Library System includes seven branches and one lending kiosk. After getting a library card, resources can be checked out online or in person at any of the branches. Additionally, Interlibrary Loan requests can be made in person or online if a resource you want is available at a different branch.

The Chesapeake Public Library offers a variety of educational, career, and literary services to community members. A core part of the mission of the Chesapeake Public Library is to “support learners at every level to succeed in their education and career paths”. This mission is accomplished in many ways, including free online classes for children and adults, access to a wide variety of digital educational resources, career help events, and creative/artistic programming.

== Infrastructure ==
=== Transportation ===
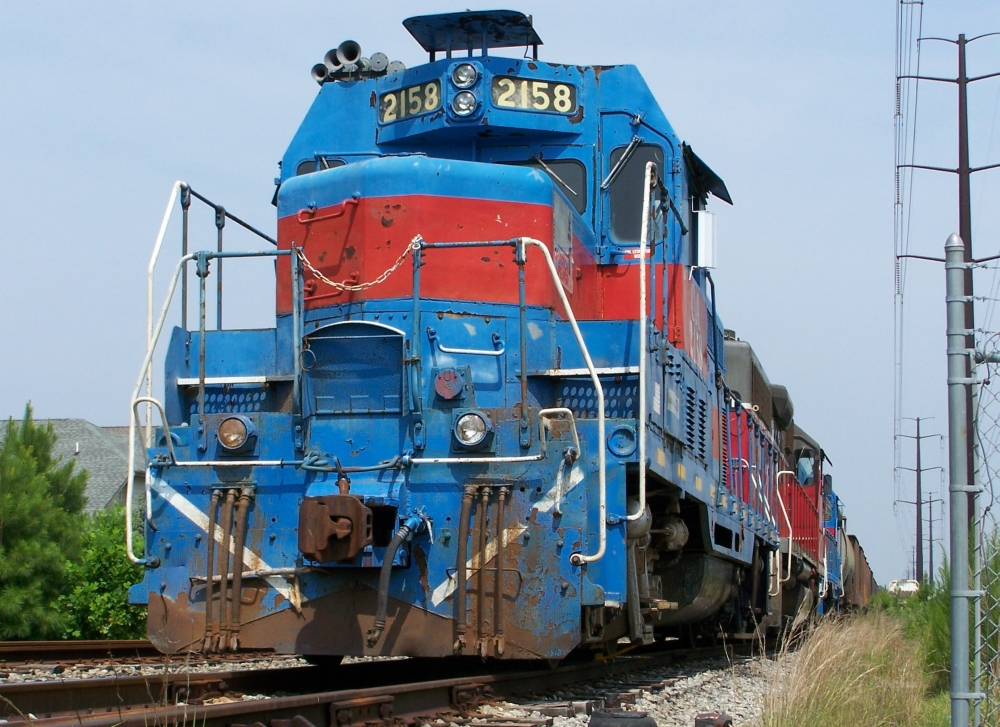
The Chesapeake and Albemarle Railroad is a shortline railroad in Chesapeake.

==== Toll road ====
Tolls in Chesapeake are currently limited to the Chesapeake Expressway, Veterans Bridge and the Jordan Bridge, but new ones may be imposed on some existing facilities to help generate revenue for transportation projects in the region.

==== Airports ====
Chesapeake is served by the nearby Norfolk International Airport in the City of Norfolk with commercial airline passenger service.

Within the city limits, Chesapeake Regional Airport is a general aviation facility located just south of Great Bridge. Also within the city is the Hampton Roads Executive Airport, located near Bowers Hill and the Hampton Roads Beltway. This airport caters to private airplane owners and enthusiasts. East of Great Bridge, NALF Fentress is a facility of the U.S. Navy and is an auxiliary landing field which is part of the large facility at NAS Oceana in neighboring Virginia Beach.

==== River and ports ====
The Intracoastal Waterway passes through Chesapeake. Chesapeake also has extensive frontage and port facilities on the navigable portions of the Western and Southern Branches of the Elizabeth River.

The Dismal Swamp Canal runs through Chesapeake as well. The site of this canal was surveyed by George Washington, among others, and is known as "Washington's Ditch". It is the oldest continuously used man made canal in the United States today and has been in service for over 230 years. The canal begins in the Deep Creek section of the city branching off from the Southern Branch of the Elizabeth River. The canal runs through Chesapeake paralleling U.S. Highway 17 into North Carolina and connects to Elizabeth City, North Carolina.

==== Rail ====
Five railroads currently pass through portions of Chesapeake and handle some intermodal traffic at port facilities on Hampton Roads and navigable portions of several of its tributary rivers. The two major Class 1 railroads are CSX Transportation and Norfolk Southern, joined by three short line railroads.

Chesapeake is located on a potential line for high-speed passenger rail service between Richmond and South Hampton Roads which is being studied by the Virginia Department of Rail and Public Transportation. A new suburban passenger station near Bowers Hill would potentially be included to supplement a terminal in downtown Norfolk.

==== Highways ====
- I-64 / I-464 / I-664 / US 13 / US 17 / US 58 / US 460 / SR 168
- Future I-87

Chesapeake is served by U.S. Highways 13, 17, 58, and 460. Interstate 64, part of the Hampton Roads Beltway, crosses through the city, Interstate 464 is a spur which connects it with downtown Norfolk and Portsmouth at the Berkley Bridge, and Interstate 664, which completes the Interstate loop from the Western Branch section of Chesapeake through the city of Newport News and into the city of Hampton.

State Route 168 is also a major highway in the area. It includes the Chesapeake Expressway toll road.

Chesapeake is the only locality in the Hampton Roads area with a separate bridge division. The city's Department of Public Works, Bridges and Structures division has 51 full-time workers. The city maintains 90 bridges and overpasses. Included are five movable span (draw) bridges which open an estimated 30,000 times a year for water vessels.

==== Bus ====
Hampton Roads Transit buses serve the city of Chesapeake as well as other cities in the Hampton Roads Area.

=== Utilities ===
Water and sewer services are provided by the city's Department of Utilities. Chesapeake receives its electricity from Dominion Virginia Power which has local sources including the Chesapeake Energy Center (a coal-fired and gas power plant), coal-fired plants in the city and Southampton County, and the Surry Nuclear Power Plant. Norfolk headquartered Virginia Natural Gas, a subsidiary of AGL Resources, distributes natural gas to the city from storage plants in James City County and in the city.

The Virginia tidewater area has grown faster than the local freshwater supply. Chesapeake receives the majority of its water from the Northwest River in the southeastern part of the city. To deal with intermittent high salt content, Chesapeake implemented an advanced reverse osmosis system at its Northwest River water treatment plant in the late 1990s. The river water has always been salty, and the fresh groundwater is no longer available in most areas. Currently, additional freshwater for the South Hampton Roads area is pumped from Lake Gaston, about 80 miles (130 km) west, which straddles the Virginia-North Carolina border along with the Blackwater and Nottaway rivers. The pipeline is 76 miles (122 km) long and 60 inches (1,500 mm) in diameter. Much of its follows the former right-of-way of an abandoned portion of the Virginian Railway. It is capable of pumping 60 million US gallons (230,000 m^{3}) of water per day. The cities of Chesapeake and Virginia Beach are partners in the project.

The city provides wastewater services for residents and transports wastewater to the regional Hampton Roads Sanitation District treatment plants.

== Notable people ==
- Eddie Butler, professional baseball player
- Michael Copon, actor, producer
- Clarence Clemons, musician
- Michael Cuddyer, professional baseball player
- Kenny Easley, member of NFL Hall of Fame
- Randy Forbes, U.S. representative from Virginia
- DeAngelo Hall, professional football player
- Percy Harvin, professional football player
- Frank Hassell (born 1988), basketball player
- Grant Holloway, 110 m hurdle world champion
- Patrick Jones II, professional football player
- Nick Leitz, NASCAR driver
- Ashton Lewis Jr., NASCAR driver
- Alonzo Mourning, professional basketball player
- Omos, former college basketball player, professional wrestler for WWE
- Darren Perry, professional NFL football player and NFL professional coach
- Jay Pharoah, comedian
- Brenden Queen, NASCAR driver
- Chris Richardson, singer
- Ricky Rudd, NASCAR driver
- Mike Scott, professional basketball player
- Don Shipley, retired Navy Seal and YouTube star
- Scott Sizemore, professional baseball player
- Ben Smith, 2015 CrossFit games champion
- Garrett Stallings, professional baseball player
- Cam Thomas, professional basketball player
- Darryl Tapp, professional football player
- Justin Upton, professional baseball player
- Melvin Upton Jr., professional baseball player
- Brianté Weber (born 1992), basketball player in the Israeli Basketball Premier League
- David Wright, professional baseball player
- Matt Van Oekel, soccer player
- Ava Max, singer

== In popular culture ==
In 2015, in honor of the game's 80th birthday, Hasbro held an online vote in order to determine which cities would make it into an updated version of the Monopoly Here and Now: The US Edition of the game. Chesapeake, Virginia won the wildcard round, earning it a brown spot.

== Sister cities ==
Chesapeake has one sister city:

- Joinville, Brazil

== See also ==
- Club Lake Ahoy
- Chesapeake Tribe
- List of famous people from Hampton Roads
- National Register of Historic Places listings in Chesapeake, Virginia
- Mayoral elections in Chesapeake, Virginia
