= Rick West (Virginia politician) =

American mayor

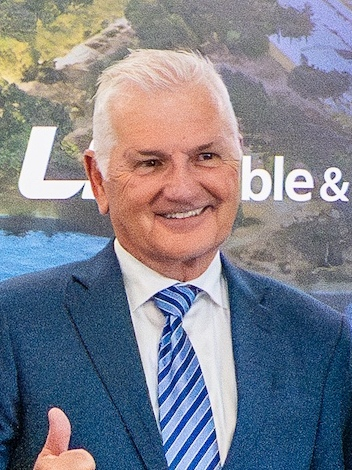

Mayor of Chesapeake, Virginia
- Incumbent
- Assumed office November 14, 2017
- Deputy: John M. de Triquet
- Preceded by: Alan P. Krasnoff

Personal details
- Political party: Republican

Richard Wayne "Rick" West is a politician currently serving as the mayor of Chesapeake, Virginia. Prior to assuming the office of mayor in November 2017, he served as a member of the city council for ten years. West also served as a public school administrator for over 20 years.

== Early life ==
Rick West was born and raised in rural Chesapeake. Since his father was in the U.S. Navy and deployed often, his mother and grandfather had the primary responsibility of raising Rick, his two brothers and two sisters.

== Electoral history ==
Chesapeake mayoral special election, 2018
Party	Candidate	Votes	%
Republican	Richard W. "Rick" West	13,342	57.81
Independent	Jo Anne Marie Gallant	9,630	41.72
Write-In	Write-in	109	0.47
Total votes		23,081	

Chesapeake mayoral general election, 2020
Party	Candidate	Votes	%
Republican	Richard W. "Rick" West	21,888	65.99
Democratic	L. T. "Len" Myers II	9,087	27.39
Green	Steffanie L. Aubuchon	1,386	4.18
Independent	Palmer Davis Smith	641	1.93
Write-In	Write-in	169	0.51
Total votes		33,171	
