= 2016–17 Morgan State Bears basketball team =

American college basketball season

2016–17 Morgan State Bears men's basketball
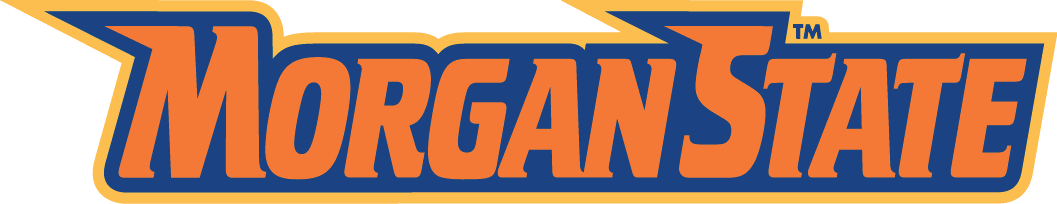
- Conference: Mid-Eastern Athletic Conference
- Record: 14–16 (11–5 MEAC)
- Head coach: Todd Bozeman (11th season)
- Assistant coaches: Brian Ellerbe; Larry Stewart; Hans Desir
- Home arena: Talmadge L. Hill Field House

2016–17 MEAC men's basketball standings
	Conf.				Overall
Team	W		L	PCT	W		L	PCT
NC Central †	13	–	3	.813	25	–	9	.735
Norfolk State	12	–	4	.750	17	–	17	.500
Morgan State	11	–	5	.688	14	–	16	.467
Hampton	11	–	5	.688	14	–	17	.452
Savannah State*	10	–	6	.625	13	–	16	.448
MD Eastern Shore	9	–	7	.563	14	–	20	.412
South Carolina State	7	–	9	.438	11	–	20	.355
Delaware State	7	–	9	.438	10	–	22	.313
Coppin State	7	–	9	.438	8	–	24	.250
Bethune–Cookman	6	–	10	.375	10	–	22	.313
Howard	5	–	11	.313	10	–	24	.294
Florida A&M	5	–	11	.313	7	–	23	.233
North Carolina A&T	1	–	15	.063	3	–	29	.094
† 2017 MEAC tournament winner *ineligible for postseason due to APR violations

The 2016–17 Morgan State Bears men's basketball team represented Morgan State University during the 2016–17 NCAA Division I men's basketball season. The Bears, led by 11th-year head coach Todd Bozeman, played their home games at the Talmadge L. Hill Field House in Baltimore, Maryland as members of the Mid-Eastern Athletic Conference. They finished the season 14–16, 11–5 in MEAC play to finish in a tie for third place. They lost in the quarterfinals of the MEAC tournament to Howard.

== Previous season ==
The Bears finished the 2015–16 season 9–22, 6–10 in MEAC play to finish in a three-way tie for ninth place. They beat Maryland Eastern Shore in the first round of the MEAC tournament, before falling to Hampton in the quarterfinals.

== Preseason ==
The Bears were picked to finish in ninth place in the preseason MEAC poll. Phillip Carr was named to the preseason All-MEAC second team.

== Roster ==
2016–17 Morgan State Bears men's basketball team
Players
Coaches

Pos.	#	Name	Height	Weight	Year	Hometown
G	0	Stanley Davis	6 ft 4 in (1.93 m)	175 lb (79 kg)	Fr	Chester, Pennsylvania
G	1	Isiah Graves	6 ft 2 in (1.88 m)	186 lb (84 kg)	Jr	Atlantic City, New Jersey
G	2	Martez Cameron	5 ft 11 in (1.8 m)	165 lb (75 kg)	So	Chicago, Illinois
F/C	3	Azariah Sykes	6 ft 8 in (2.03 m)	210 lb (95 kg)	Fr	Midlothian, Virginia
G	5	Tiwian Kendley	6 ft 5 in (1.96 m)	190 lb (86 kg)	Jr	Harlem, New York
G	10	Antonio Gillespie	6 ft 0 in (1.83 m)	170 lb (77 kg)	So	Memphis, Tennessee
G	11	Clive "C.J." Vaughan Jr.	6 ft 2 in (1.88 m)	190 lb (86 kg)	Jr	Aurora, Illinois
F/C	12	Alex Ennis	6 ft 10 in (2.08 m)	225 lb (102 kg)	Jr	Ocean, New Jersey
G	13	Tyler Streeter	6 ft 4 in (1.93 m)	190 lb (86 kg)	So	Chicago, Illinois
F	21	Kyle Thomas	6 ft 7 in (2.01 m)	200 lb (91 kg)	Sr	Owings Mills, Maryland
F	22	Phillip Carr	6 ft 8 in (2.03 m)	200 lb (91 kg)	Jr	Brooklyn, New York
F	32	David Syfax	6 ft 7 in (2.01 m)	205 lb (93 kg)	Fr	Detroit, Michigan
F/C	44	Tyjhai Byers	6 ft 10 in (2.08 m)	210 lb (95 kg)	Fr	Bethesda, Maryland

Head coach

- Todd Bozeman (Rhode Island)

Assistant coach(es)

- Brian Ellerbe (Rutgers)
- Larry Stewart (Coppin State)
- Hans Desir (St. Catharine College)

Legend

- (C) Team captain
- (S) Suspended
- (I) Ineligible
- (W) Walk-on
- Injured
- Current redshirt

Roster

== Schedule and results ==
Date time, TV	Rank^{#}	Opponent^{#}	Result	Record	Site (attendance) city, state
Non-conference regular season
11/11/2016*; 8:00 pm, ESPN3		at Houston	L 52–93	0–1	Hofheinz Pavilion (3,005); Houston, TX
11/15/2016*; 7:00 pm		Towson	L 72–78	0–2	Talmadge L. Hill Field House (3,047); Baltimore, MD
11/17/2016*; 7:45 pm		Wilmington	W 88–73	1–2	Talmadge L. Hill Field House (895); Baltimore, MD
11/19/2016*; 1:00 pm		Campbell	W 82–66	2–2	Talmadge L. Hill Field House (804); Baltimore, MD
11/23/2016*; 4:00 pm		at Brown	L 75–81	2–3	Pizzitola Sports Center (487); Providence, RI
11/26/2016*; 12:00 pm		at Bowling Green	L 58–90	2–4	Stroh Center (1,074); Bowling Green, OH
11/28/2016*; 7:00 pm		High Point	L 61–62	2–5	Talmadge L. Hill Field House (892); Baltimore, MD
12/03/2016*; 7:00 pm, BTN+		at Rutgers	L 58–72	2–6	The RAC (5,081); Piscataway, NJ
12/06/2016*; 7:00 pm		Manhattan	W 85–82 ^{2OT}	3–6	Talmadge L. Hill Field House (1,432); Baltimore, MD
12/10/2016*; 1:00 pm		Wagner	L 66–68	3–7	Talmadge L. Hill Field House (1,007); Baltimore, MD
12/21/2016*; 5:00 pm, BTN+		at Penn State	L 55–96	3–8	Bryce Jordan Center (4,009); University Park, PA
12/26/2016*; 8:00 pm		at Loyola Marymount	L 49–70	3–9	Gersten Pavilion (1,849); Los Angeles, CA
12/29/2016*; 10:00 pm		at Cal State Northridge	L 61–82	3–10	Matadome (569); Northridge, CA
MEAC regular season
01/04/2017; 4:00 pm		Norfolk State	W 58–56	4–10 (1–0)	Talmadge L. Hill Field House (974); Baltimore, MD
01/07/2017; 4:00 pm		at Bethune–Cookman	W 69–63	5–10 (2–0)	Moore Gymnasium (619); Daytona Beach, FL
01/10/2017; 7:00 pm		at Florida A&M	W 62–59	6–10 (3–0)	Teaching Gym (1,317); Tallahassee, FL
01/16/2017; 7:30 pm		North Carolina A&T	W 82–53	7–10 (4–0)	Talmadge L. Hill Field House (1,067); Baltimore, MD
01/21/2017; 6:00 pm		at Savannah State	L 61–74	7–11 (4–1)	Tiger Arena (1,230); Savannah, GA
01/23/2017; 7:30 pm		at South Carolina State	W 77–75	8–11 (5–1)	SHM Memorial Center (432); Orangeburg, SC
01/28/2017; 4:00 pm		at Coppin State	W 76–74	9–11 (6–1)	Physical Education Complex (1,899); Baltimore, MD
01/30/2017; 7:30 pm		Florida A&M	W 77–60	10–11 (7–1)	Talmadge L. Hill Field House (1,007); Baltimore, MD
02/04/2017; 4:00 pm		North Carolina Central	L 62–68	10–12 (7–2)	Talmadge L. Hill Field House (1,103); Baltimore, MD
02/11/2017; 4:00 pm		Delaware State	L 45–56	10–13 (7–3)	Talmadge L. Hill Field House (1,052); Baltimore, MD
02/13/2017; 9:00 pm, ESPNU		at Howard	L 67–70	10–14 (7–4)	Burr Gymnasium (934); Washington, D.C.
02/18/2017; 4:00 pm		Savannah State	W 83–75	11–14 (8–4)	Talmadge L. Hill Field House (1,056); Baltimore, MD
02/20/2017; 7:30 pm		at Delaware State	W 65–54	12–14 (9–4)	Memorial Hall (1,034); Dover, DE
02/25/2017; 4:00 pm		Hampton	W 77–70	13–14 (10–4)	Talmadge L. Hill Field House (2,478); Baltimore, MD
02/27/2017; 8:00 pm		Coppin State	W 71–66	14–14 (11–4)	Talmadge L. Hill Field House (4,078); Baltimore, MD
03/02/2017; 7:30 pm		at Maryland Eastern Shore	L 66–67	14–15 (11–5)	Hytche Athletic Center (2,110); Princess Anne, MD
MEAC tournament
03/09/2017; 6:00 pm	(3)	vs. (11) Howard; Quarterfinals	L 65–68	14–16	Norfolk Scope; Norfolk, VA
*Non-conference game. ^{#}Rankings from AP Poll. (#) Tournament seedings in parentheses. All times are in Eastern Time. Source
