= 2016–17 Hampton Pirates basketball team =

American college basketball season

2016–17 Hampton Pirates men's basketball
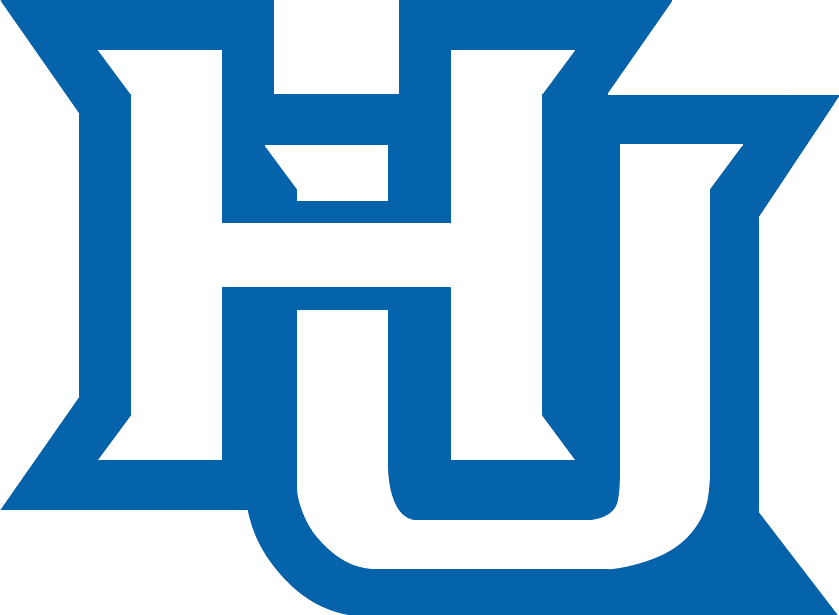

CBI, First round
- Conference: Mid-Eastern Athletic Conference
- Record: 14–17 (11–5 MEAC)
- Head coach: Edward Joyner (8th season)
- Assistant coaches: Darryl Sharp; Matthew Hamilton; Brian Graves
- Home arena: Hampton Convocation Center

2016–17 MEAC men's basketball standings
	Conf.				Overall
Team	W		L	PCT	W		L	PCT
NC Central †	13	–	3	.813	25	–	9	.735
Norfolk State	12	–	4	.750	17	–	17	.500
Morgan State	11	–	5	.688	14	–	16	.467
Hampton	11	–	5	.688	14	–	17	.452
Savannah State*	10	–	6	.625	13	–	16	.448
MD Eastern Shore	9	–	7	.563	14	–	20	.412
South Carolina State	7	–	9	.438	11	–	20	.355
Delaware State	7	–	9	.438	10	–	22	.313
Coppin State	7	–	9	.438	8	–	24	.250
Bethune–Cookman	6	–	10	.375	10	–	22	.313
Howard	5	–	11	.313	10	–	24	.294
Florida A&M	5	–	11	.313	7	–	23	.233
North Carolina A&T	1	–	15	.063	3	–	29	.094
† 2017 MEAC tournament winner *ineligible for postseason due to APR violations

The 2016–17 Hampton Pirates men's basketball team represented Hampton University during the 2016–17 NCAA Division I men's basketball season. The Pirates, led by eighth-year head coach Edward Joyner, played their home games at the Hampton Convocation Center as members of the Mid-Eastern Athletic Conference. They finished the season 14–17, 11–5 in MEAC play to finish in a tie for third place. They lost in the quarterfinals of the MEAC tournament to Maryland Eastern Shore. They were invited to the College Basketball Invitational where they lost in the first round to Coastal Carolina.

== Previous season ==
The Pirates finished the 2015–16 season 21–11, 13–3 in MEAC play to win the MEAC regular season championship. They defeated Morgan State, Savannah State, and South Carolina State to win the MEAC tournament and earn the conference's automatic bid to the NCAA tournament. As a No. 16 seed in the NCAA Tournament, they lost in the First round to Virginia.

== Preseason ==
The Pirates were picked to finish in third place in the preseason MEAC poll.

== Roster ==
2016–17 Hampton Pirates men's basketball team
Players
Coaches

Pos.	#	Name	Height	Weight	Year	Hometown
G	0	Jaekwon Carliyle	5 ft 10 in (1.78 m)	177 lb (80 kg)	Fr	Philadelphia, Pennsylvania
G	1	Donald Ralls	6 ft 0 in (1.83 m)	185 lb (84 kg)	Jr	Philadelphia, Pennsylvania
G	2	Jermaine Marrow	6 ft 0 in (1.83 m)	182 lb (83 kg)	Fr	Newport News, Virginia
G/F	3	Trey Carver	6 ft 5 in (1.96 m)	256 lb (116 kg)	Fr	Elizabeth City, North Carolina
G	4	Lawrence Cooks	6 ft 1 in (1.85 m)	180 lb (82 kg)	GS	Charlotte, North Carolina
G	11	Trey Houston	6 ft 0 in (1.83 m)	155 lb (70 kg)	RS Fr	Atlanta, Georgia
G	12	Imani Miller	6 ft 1 in (1.85 m)	185 lb (84 kg)	So	Knoxville, Tennessee
F	15	Branden Aughburns	6 ft 9 in (2.06 m)	230 lb (104 kg)	RS So	Queens, New York
F	20	AJ Astroth	6 ft 6 in (1.98 m)	200 lb (91 kg)	GS	Tampa, Florida
G	21	Devon Oakley	6 ft 3 in (1.91 m)	185 lb (84 kg)	So	Chesapeake, Virginia
F	22	Trevond Barnes	6 ft 9 in (2.06 m)	210 lb (95 kg)	So	LaFayette, Alabama
G	23	Kalin Fisher	6 ft 2 in (1.88 m)	180 lb (82 kg)	So	Chicago, Illinois
G	25	Akim Mitchell	6 ft 5 in (1.96 m)	200 lb (91 kg)	So	Charlotte, North Carolina
F	31	Charles Wilson-Fisher	6 ft 9 in (2.06 m)	205 lb (93 kg)	Jr	Los Angeles, California
G	33	Lysander Bracey	6 ft 4 in (1.93 m)	156 lb (71 kg)	Fr	Charlotte, North Carolina
G	45	Eugene Marshall III	6 ft 3 in (1.91 m)	170 lb (77 kg)	RS Fr	Hackensack, New Jersey

Head coach

- Edward Joyner (Johnson C. Smith)

Assistant coach(es)

- Darryl Sharp (Bloomsburg (PA))
- Matthew Hamilton (Appalachian State)
- Brian Graves (Catawba College)

Legend

- (C) Team captain
- (S) Suspended
- (I) Ineligible
- (W) Walk-on
- Injured
- Current redshirt

Roster

== Schedule and results ==
Date time, TV	Rank^{#}	Opponent^{#}	Result	Record	Site (attendance) city, state
Non-conference regular season
11/11/2016*; 7:00 pm		Rider	L 56–67	0–1	Hampton Convocation Center (2,152); Hampton, VA
11/17/2016*; 7:00 pm		Chowan	W 70–69 ^{OT}	1–1	Hampton Convocation Center; Hampton, VA
11/20/2016*; 6:00 pm, FSKC		at Kansas State; Barclays Center Classic	L 67–89	1–2	Bramlage Coliseum (11,316); Manhattan, KS
11/22/2016*; 12:00 pm, CSN		at Richmond; Barclays Center Classic	L 52–65	1–3	Robins Center (6,094); Richmond, VA
11/25/2016*; 7:30 pm		vs. Robert Morris; Barclays Center Classic	L 48–62	1–4	SECU Arena (250); Towson, MD
11/26/2016*; 5:00 pm		vs. Stony Brook; Barclays Center Classic	L 66–76	1–5	SECU Arena; Towson, MD
11/29/2016*; 7:00 pm, ESPN3		at East Carolina	L 48–68	1–6	Williams Arena at Minges Coliseum (3,631); Greenville, NC
12/03/2016*; 4:00 pm		William & Mary	W 79–69	2–6	Hampton Convocation Center (3,123); Hampton, VA
12/07/2016*; 7:00 pm		at Gardner–Webb	L 63–69	2–7	Paul Porter Arena (1,189); Boiling Springs, NC
12/17/2016*; 2:00 pm		Winthrop	L 79–86	2–8	Hampton Convocation Center (2,123); Hampton, VA
12/21/2016*; 7:00 pm		at Appalachian State	L 67–88	2–9	Holmes Center (584); Boone, NC
12/28/2016*; 5:00 pm		at Princeton	L 49–77	2–10	Jadwin Gymnasium (1,838); Princeton, NJ
12/30/2016*; 7:00 pm		Coker	W 94–69	3–10	Hampton Convocation Center (2,123); Hampton, VA
MEAC regular season
01/04/2017; 7:00 pm		North Carolina A&T	W 68–53	4–10 (1–0)	Hampton Convocation Center (2,103); Hampton, VA
01/09/2017; 7:00 pm		Savannah State	W 84–80	5–10 (2–0)	Hampton Convocation Center (1,234); Hampton, VA
01/14/2017; 4:00 pm		at Delaware State	W 85–77 ^{OT}	6–10 (3–0)	Memorial Hall (1,149); Dover, DE
01/16/2017; 7:00 pm, ESPNU		North Carolina Central	L 51–64	6–11 (3–1)	Hampton Convocation Center (4,545); Hampton, VA
01/21/2017; 6:00 pm		at Norfolk State	L 62–79	6–12 (3–2)	Joseph G. Echols Memorial Hall (4,828); Norfolk, VA
01/25/2017; 7:00 pm		South Carolina State	L 66–68	6–13 (3–3)	Hampton Convocation Center (3,214); Hampton, VA
01/30/2017; 7:00 pm		Coppin State	W 77–65	7–13 (4–3)	Hampton Convocation Center (2,487); Hampton, VA
02/01/2017; 7:00 pm		Maryland Eastern Shore	W 66–65	8–13 (5–3)	Hampton Convocation Center (2,651); Hampton, VA
02/04/2017; 6:00 pm		at Savannah State	W 92–89	9–13 (6–3)	Tiger Arena (2,328); Savannah, GA
02/06/2017; 7:30 pm		at South Carolina State	W 93–64	10–13 (7–3)	SHM Memorial Center (487); Orangeburg, SC
02/11/2017; 6:00 pm		Howard	W 75–61	11–13 (8–3)	Hampton Convocation Center (6,123); Hampton, VA
02/18/2017; 4:00 pm		at Bethune–Cookman	L 61–62	11–14 (8–4)	Moore Gymnasium (823); Daytona Beach, FL
02/20/2017; 8:00 pm		at Florida A&M	W 76–69	12–14 (9–4)	Teaching Gym (1,145); Tallahassee, FL
02/25/2017; 8:00 pm		at Morgan State	L 70–77	12–15 (9–5)	Talmadge L. Hill Field House (2,478); Baltimore, MD
02/27/2017; 9:00 pm, ESPNU		Norfolk State	W 63–59	13–15 (10–5)	Hampton Convocation Center (6,123); Hampton, VA
03/02/2017; 8:00 pm		at Coppin State	W 89–82	14–15 (11–5)	Physical Education Complex (833); Baltimore, MD
MEAC tournament
03/09/2017; 8:00 pm, ESPN3	(4)	vs. (5) Maryland Eastern Shore; Quarterfinals	L 66–68	14–16	Norfolk Scope; Norfolk, VA
CBI
03/15/2017*; 7:00 pm		at Coastal Carolina; First round	L 67–83	14–17	HTC Center; Conway, SC
*Non-conference game. ^{#}Rankings from AP Poll. (#) Tournament seedings in parentheses. All times are in Eastern Time Source.
