= 2016–17 Delaware State Hornets men's basketball team =

American college basketball season

2016–17 Delaware State Hornets men's basketball
- Conference: Mid-Eastern Athletic Conference
- Record: 10–22 (7–9 MEAC)
- Head coach: Keith Walker (3rd season)
- Assistant coaches: Keith Johnson; Kevin Washington; Arthur Tyson
- Home arena: Memorial Hall

2016–17 MEAC men's basketball standings
	Conf.				Overall
Team	W		L	PCT	W		L	PCT
NC Central †	13	–	3	.813	25	–	9	.735
Norfolk State	12	–	4	.750	17	–	17	.500
Morgan State	11	–	5	.688	14	–	16	.467
Hampton	11	–	5	.688	14	–	17	.452
Savannah State*	10	–	6	.625	13	–	16	.448
MD Eastern Shore	9	–	7	.563	14	–	20	.412
South Carolina State	7	–	9	.438	11	–	20	.355
Delaware State	7	–	9	.438	10	–	22	.313
Coppin State	7	–	9	.438	8	–	24	.250
Bethune–Cookman	6	–	10	.375	10	–	22	.313
Howard	5	–	11	.313	10	–	24	.294
Florida A&M	5	–	11	.313	7	–	23	.233
North Carolina A&T	1	–	15	.063	3	–	29	.094
† 2017 MEAC tournament winner *ineligible for postseason due to APR violations

The 2016–17 Delaware State Hornets men's basketball team represented Delaware State University during the 2016–17 NCAA Division I men's basketball season. The Hornets, led by third-year head coach Keith Walker, played their home games at Memorial Hall as members of the Mid-Eastern Athletic Conference. They finished the season 10–22, 7–9 in MEAC play to finish in a three-way tie for seventh place. They lost in the first round of the MEAC tournament to Bethune–Cookman.

== Previous season ==
The Hornets finished the 2015–16 season 7–25, 5–11 record in MEAC play to finish in a tie for 12th place. They lost to Savannah State in the first round of the MEAC tournament.

== Preseason ==
The Hornets were picked to finish 12th in the MEAC preseason poll. Devin Morgan was selected the All-MEAC preseason second team and DeAndre Haywood was picked for the third team.

== Roster ==
2016–17 Delaware State Hornets men's basketball team
Players
Coaches

Pos.	#	Name	Height	Weight	Year	Hometown
G	0	Quincy Tillinghast	6 ft 0 in (1.83 m)	175 lb (79 kg)	RS So	Cincinnati, Ohio
G	1	DeAndre Haywood	6 ft 2 in (1.88 m)	200 lb (91 kg)	Sr	Paterson, New Jersey
G	2	Jamelle Christian	6 ft 1 in (1.85 m)	190 lb (86 kg)	RS So	Washington, D.C.
F/C	3	Joseph Lewis	6 ft 9 in (2.06 m)	225 lb (102 kg)	Jr	Detroit, Michigan
G	5	Kobe Gantz	6 ft 4 in (1.93 m)	180 lb (82 kg)	Fr	Lancaster, Pennsylvania
F	10	Kavon Waller	6 ft 5 in (1.96 m)	210 lb (95 kg)	Jr	Chester, Virginia
G	13	Mahir Johnson	6 ft 2 in (1.88 m)	185 lb (84 kg)	So	Chester, Pennsylvania
F	15	Marquise Collins	6 ft 7 in (2.01 m)	210 lb (95 kg)	Fr	Chester, Pennsylvania
F/C	20	Mrdjan Gasevic	6 ft 8 in (2.03 m)	235 lb (107 kg)	Sr	Mladenovac, Serbia
G/F	21	Dana Raysor	6 ft 5 in (1.96 m)	200 lb (91 kg)	Jr	Willingboro, New Jersey
G	22	Devin Morgan	5 ft 10 in (1.78 m)	180 lb (82 kg)	So	Chester, Virginia
G	23	Jordan Bushrod	6 ft 4 in (1.93 m)	190 lb (86 kg)	So	Dover, Delaware
F	24	Artem Tavakalyan	6 ft 6 in (1.98 m)	210 lb (95 kg)	Jr	Moscow, Russia
F/C	25	Kevin Noulowe	6 ft 9 in (2.06 m)	240 lb (109 kg)	So	Gaithersburg, Maryland
F/C	32	Maurice Henry	6 ft 9 in (2.06 m)	235 lb (107 kg)	Fr	Chester, Pennsylvania
F	44	DeVaughn Mallory	6 ft 7 in (2.01 m)	200 lb (91 kg)	So	Dover, Delaware
C	50	Demola Onifade	6 ft 9 in (2.06 m)	245 lb (111 kg)	So	Lagos, Nigeria

Head coach

- Keith Walker (Clemson)

Assistant coach(es)

- Keith Johnson (Cheyney)
- Kevin Washington (St. Augustine's)
- Arthur Tyson (North Carolina Central)

Legend

- (C) Team captain
- (S) Suspended
- (I) Ineligible
- (W) Walk-on
- Injured
- Current redshirt

Roster

== Schedule and results ==
Date time, TV	Rank^{#}	Opponent^{#}	Result	Record	Site (attendance) city, state
Non-conference regular season
11/11/2016*; 8:00 pm		Clarks Summit	W 103–56	1–0	Memorial Hall (1,467); Dover, DE
11/13/2016*; 2:00 pm		Texas Southern; Hardwood Showcase	L 61–74	1–1	Memorial Hall (942); Dover, DE
11/16/2016*; 7:00 pm		at UMBC	L 68–90	1–2	Retriever Activities Center (612); Catonsville, MD
11/21/2016*; 8:00 pm		at Louisiana–Lafayette; Hardwood Showcase	L 82–83	1–3	Cajundome (1,822); Lafayette, LA
11/23/2016*; 8:00 pm		at Rice; Hardwood Showcase	L 58–80	1–4	Tudor Fieldhouse (1,275); Houston, TX
11/26/2016*; 4:00 pm		at Montana State; Hardwood Showcase	L 66–91	1–5	Brick Breeden Fieldhouse (2,307); Bozeman, MT
11/29/2016*; 6:30 pm, FS2		at St. John's	W 79–72	2–5	Carnesecca Arena (4,109); Queens, NY
12/02/2016*; 7:00 pm		at Delaware; Route 1 Rivalry	L 49–64	2–6	Bob Carpenter Center (2,492); Newark, DE
12/04/2016*; 4:00 pm, ESPN3		at SMU	L 60–74	2–7	Moody Coliseum (6,852); Dallas, TX
12/08/2016*; 8:00 pm		at North Texas	L 40–73	2–8	The Super Pit (1,707); Denton, TX
12/10/2016*; 4:00 pm		Keystone	W 92–69	3–8	Memorial Hall (978); Dover, DE
12/17/2016*; 2:00 pm		at Binghamton	L 66–85	3–9	Binghamton University Events Center (2,001); Vestal, NY
12/19/2016*; 8:00 pm, BTN		at No. 16 Indiana	L 56–103	3–10	Simon Skjodt Assembly Hall (13,307); Bloomington, IN
12/19/2016*; 8:00 pm, BTN		at Iowa	L 57–89	3–11	Carver–Hawkeye Arena (11,886); Iowa City, IA
12/30/2016*; 1:00 am		at Hawaii	L 66–77	3–12	Stan Sheriff Center (5,903); Honolulu, HI
MEAC regular season
01/07/2017; 4:00 pm		at North Carolina A&T	W 55–53	4–12 (1–0)	Corbett Sports Center (531); Greensboro, NC
01/10/2017; 4:00 pm		at North Carolina Central	W 69–68	5–12 (2–0)	McLendon–McDougald Gymnasium (859); Durham, NC
01/14/2017; 4:00 pm		Hampton	L 77–85 ^{OT}	5–13 (2–1)	Memorial Hall (1,149); Dover, DE
01/16/2017; 7:30 pm		Norfolk State	L 70–75	5–14 (2–2)	Memorial Hall (1,067); Dover, DE
01/21/2017; 4:00 pm		at South Carolina State	L 64–74	5–15 (2–3)	SHM Memorial Center (608); Orangeburg, SC
01/23/2017; 8:00 pm		at Savannah State	L 79–94	5–16 (2–4)	Tiger Arena (1,520); Savannah, GA
01/28/2017; 4:00 pm		Florida A&M	L 68–81	5–17 (2–5)	Memorial Hall (1,279); Dover, DE
01/30/2017; 7:30 pm		North Carolina Central	L 74–82	5–18 (2–6)	Memorial Hall (943); Dover, DE
02/01/2017; 7:30 pm		North Carolina A&T	W 82–65	6–18 (3–6)	Memorial Hall (857); Dover, DE
02/04/2017; 4:00 pm		at Bethune-Cookman	W 88–82 ^{OT}	7–18 (4–6)	Moore Gymnasium (781); Daytona Beach, FL
02/06/2017; 8:00 pm		at Florida A&M	W 80–77 ^{OT}	8–18 (5–6)	Teaching Gym (2,278); Tallahassee, FL
02/11/2017; 4:00 pm		at Morgan State	W 56–45	9–18 (6–6)	Talmadge L. Hill Field House (1,052); Baltimore, MD
02/13/2017; 7:30 pm		at Coppin State	L 75–83	9–19 (6–7)	Physical Education Complex (899); Baltimore, MD
02/20/2017; 7:30 pm		Morgan State	W 65–54	9–20 (6–8)	Memorial Hall (1,034); Dover, DE
02/25/2017; 4:00 pm		Maryland Eastern Shore	L 64–65	9–21 (6–9)	Memorial Hall (1,928); Dover, DE
03/02/2017; 7:30 pm		Howard	W 66–56	10–21 (7–9)	Memorial Hall (1,348); Dover, DE
MEAC tournament
03/07/2017; 4:00 pm	(8)	vs. (9) Bethune-Cookman; First round	L 62–69	10–22	Norfolk Scope; Norfolk, VA
*Non-conference game. ^{#}Rankings from AP Poll. (#) Tournament seedings in parentheses. All times are in Eastern Time. Source
