= 2016–17 Bethune–Cookman Wildcats men's basketball team =

American college basketball season

2016–17 Bethune–Cookman Wildcats men's basketball
- Conference: Mid-Eastern Athletic Conference
- Record: 10–22 (6–10 MEAC)
- Head coach: Gravelle Craig (6th season)
- Assistant coach: Rodney Martin; Stacy Beckton; Chrys Cornelius
- Home arena: Moore Gymnasium

2016–17 MEAC men's basketball standings
	Conf.				Overall
Team	W		L	PCT	W		L	PCT
NC Central †	13	–	3	.813	25	–	9	.735
Norfolk State	12	–	4	.750	17	–	17	.500
Morgan State	11	–	5	.688	14	–	16	.467
Hampton	11	–	5	.688	14	–	17	.452
Savannah State*	10	–	6	.625	13	–	16	.448
MD Eastern Shore	9	–	7	.563	14	–	20	.412
South Carolina State	7	–	9	.438	11	–	20	.355
Delaware State	7	–	9	.438	10	–	22	.313
Coppin State	7	–	9	.438	8	–	24	.250
Bethune–Cookman	6	–	10	.375	10	–	22	.313
Howard	5	–	11	.313	10	–	24	.294
Florida A&M	5	–	11	.313	7	–	23	.233
North Carolina A&T	1	–	15	.063	3	–	29	.094
† 2017 MEAC tournament winner *ineligible for postseason due to APR violations

The 2016–17 Bethune–Cookman Wildcats men's basketball team represented Bethune-Cookman University during the 2016–17 NCAA Division I men's basketball season. The Wildcats, led by sixth-year head coach Gravelle Craig, played their home games at the Moore Gymnasium in Daytona Beach, Florida as members of the Mid-Eastern Athletic Conference. They finished the season 10–22, 6–10 in MEAC play to finish in tenth place. They defeated Delaware State before losing in the quarterfinals of the MEAC tournament to North Carolina Central.

On March 20, 2017, it was announced that head coach Gravelle Craig's contract would not be renewed. He finished at Bethune–Cookman with a six-year record of 74–123. The Wildcats hired Ryan Ridder from Daytona State of the NJCAA as the new head coach on March 31.

== Previous season ==
The Wildcats finished the 2015–16 season 14–18, 10–6 in MEAC play to finish in fourth place. They lost in the quarterfinals of the MEAC tournament to Savannah State.

== Preseason ==
The Wildcats were picked to finish sixth in the MEAC preseason poll. Jordan Potts was selected the All-MEAC preseason first team.

== Roster ==
2016–17 Bethune–Cookman Wildcats men's basketball team
Players
Coaches

Pos.	#	Name	Height	Weight	Year	Hometown
G	1	Josue Salaam	6 ft 4 in (1.93 m)	210 lb (95 kg)	Sr	San Francisco, California
G	2	Diamante Lewis	6 ft 3 in (1.91 m)	195 lb (88 kg)	Sr	Ocala, Florida
G/F	3	Brandon Tabb	6 ft 5 in (1.96 m)	200 lb (91 kg)	Jr	Hampton, Virginia
G	4	Jamal Gaines	6 ft 3 in (1.91 m)	185 lb (84 kg)	Fr	Sarasota, Florida
G	5	Danny Harris	5 ft 9 in (1.75 m)	165 lb (75 kg)	Fr	Fort Lauderdale, Florida
PG	10	Jordan Potts	5 ft 10 in (1.78 m)	185 lb (84 kg)	RS Sr	Columbus, Ohio
G	11	Marquel Ingram	6 ft 2 in (1.88 m)	200 lb (91 kg)	So	Detroit, Michigan
G	12	Quinton Forrest	6 ft 5 in (1.96 m)	210 lb (95 kg)	So	Windermere, Florida
G	15	Reggie Baker	6 ft 4 in (1.93 m)	185 lb (84 kg)	RS Sr	Avon Park, Florida
G	21	Jeffrey Altidort	6 ft 1 in (1.85 m)	180 lb (82 kg)	Jr	Coral Springs, Florida
G	22	Houston Smith	6 ft 4 in (1.93 m)	210 lb (95 kg)	Fr	Columbus, Ohio
F	32	Ulmer Manzie	6 ft 9 in (2.06 m)	240 lb (109 kg)	RS Fr	Columbus, Ohio
F	33	Brandon Suggs	6 ft 8 in (2.03 m)	215 lb (98 kg)	Fr	Winnebago, Illinois

Head coach

- Gravelle Craig (Cleveland State)

Assistant coach(es)

- Rodney Martin (Tiffin University)
- Stacey Beckton (St. John's Community College)
- Chrys Cornelius (Western Illinois)

Legend

- (C) Team captain
- (S) Suspended
- (I) Ineligible
- (W) Walk-on
- Injured
- Current redshirt

Roster

== Schedule and results ==
Date time, TV	Rank^{#}	Opponent^{#}	Result	Record	Site (attendance) city, state
Regular season
11/11/2016*; 9:00 pm, FS2		at St. John's	L 53–100	0–1	Carnesecca Arena (4,371); Queens, NY
11/16/2016*; 7:30 pm		Kennesaw State	W 75–72	1–1	Moore Gymnasium (678); Daytona Beach, FL
11/18/2016*; 7:00 pm		Trinity (FL)	W 82–52	2–1	Moore Gymnasium (67); Daytona Beach, FL
11/20/2016*; 5:00 pm		at New Mexico State; San Diego Classic	L 73–89	2–2	Pan American Center (4,323); Las Cruces, NM
11/22/2016*; 10:00 pm		at San Diego; San Diego Classic	L 91–96 ^{3OT}	2–3	Jenny Craig Pavilion (866); San Diego, CA
11/25/2016*; 3:00 pm		vs. Nicholls State; San Diego Classic	L 69–76	2–4	Pete Hanna Center (167); Birmingham, AL
11/26/2016*; 8:00 pm		at Samford; San Diego Classic	L 65–93	2–5	Pete Hanna Center (686); Birmingham, AL
12/03/2016*; 12:00 pm		at Cleveland State	L 62–73	2–6	Quicken Loans Arena (1,227); Cleveland, OH
12/05/2016*; 8:00 pm		Jacksonville	L 66–76	2–7	Moore Gymnasium (717); Daytona Beach, FL
12/10/2016*; 2:00 pm		Florida College	W 81–79 ^{OT}	3–7	Moore Gymnasium (422); Daytona Beach, FL
12/12/2016*; 7:00 pm, ESPN3		at South Florida	L 73–79 ^{OT}	3–8	USF Sun Dome (2,207); Tampa, FL
12/17/2016*; 8:00 pm		at UT Martin	L 72–97	3–9	Skyhawk Arena (896); Martin, TN
12/21/2016*; 7:00 pm, ESPN3		at UCF	L 41–71	3–10	CFE Arena (3,348); Orlando, FL
01/04/2017; 7:30 pm		at Savannah State	L 91–104	3–11 (0–1)	Tiger Arena (901); Savannah, GA
01/07/2017; 4:00 pm		Morgan State	L 63–69	3–12 (0–2)	Moore Gymnasium (619); Daytona Beach, FL
01/09/2017; 7:30 pm		Coppin State	L 73–76	3–13 (0–3)	Moore Gymnasium (711); Daytona Beach, FL
01/14/2017; 4:00 pm		at South Carolina State	L 74–78	3–14 (0–4)	SHM Memorial Center (392); Orangeburg, SC
01/16/2017; 4:00 pm		at Florida A&M	W 82–76	4–14 (1–4)	Teaching Gym (4,878); Tallahassee, FL
01/21/2017; 4:00 pm		Maryland Eastern Shore	L 79–82	4–15 (1–5)	Moore Gymnasium (802); Daytona Beach, FL
01/28/2017; 4:00 pm		at Norfolk State	L 66–73	4–16 (1–6)	Joseph G. Echols Memorial Hall (2,512); Norfolk, VA
02/01/2017*; 7:00 pm		Stetson	L 67–76	4–17	Moore Gymnasium (612); Daytona Beach, FL
02/04/2017; 4:00 pm		Delaware State	L 82–88 ^{OT}	4–18 (1–7)	Moore Gymnasium (781); Daytona Beach, FL
02/06/2017; 7:30 pm		Howard	W 71–67	5–18 (1–8)	Moore Gymnasium (981); Daytona Beach, FL
02/11/2017; 4:00 pm		at Coppin State	L 72–76	5–19 (2–8)	Physical Education Complex; Baltimore, MD
02/13/2017; 7:30 pm		at Maryland Eastern Shore	L 81–82 ^{OT}	5–20 (2–9)	Hytche Athletic Center (2,067); Princess Anne, MD
02/18/2017; 4:00 pm		Hampton	W 62–61	6–20 (3–9)	Moore Gymnasium (823); Daytona Beach, FL
02/20/2017; 7:30 pm		Norfolk State	W 75–65	7–20 (4–9)	Moore Gymnasium (812); Daytona Beach, FL
02/25/2017; 4:00 pm		at North Carolina Central	L 63–78	7–21 (4–10)	McLendon–McDougald Gymnasium (1,622); Durham, NC
02/27/2017; 4:00 pm		at North Carolina A&T	W 73–70	8–21 (5–10)	Corbett Sports Center (1,037); Greensboro, NC
03/02/2017; 7:00 pm		Florida A&M	W 69–59	9–21 (6–10)	Moore Gymnasium; Daytona Beach, FL
MEAC tournament
03/07/2017; 3:00 pm, ESPN3	(9)	vs. (8) Delaware State	W 69–62	10–21	Norfolk Scope; Norfolk, VA
03/08/2017; 5:00 pm, ESPN3	(9)	vs. (1) North Carolina Central	L 60–95	10–22	Norfolk Scope; Norfolk, VA
*Non-conference game. ^{#}Rankings from AP Poll. (#) Tournament seedings in parentheses. All times are in Eastern Time. Source
