= 2016–17 Savannah State Tigers basketball team =

American college basketball season

2016–17 Savannah State Tigers basketball
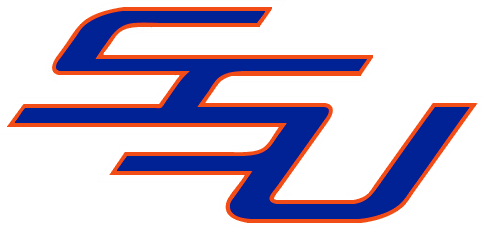
- Conference: Mid-Eastern Athletic Conference
- Record: 13–16 (10–6 MEAC)
- Head coach: Horace Broadnax (12th season)
- Assistant coaches: Clyde Wormley; Timothy "Pat" Hardy; Joseph Flegler
- Home arena: Tiger Arena

2016–17 MEAC men's basketball standings
| | Conf. | | | | Overall |
| Team | W | | L | PCT | W | | L | PCT |
|---|---|---|---|---|---|---|---|---|
| NC Central † | 13 | – | 3 | .813 | 25 | – | 9 | .735 |
| Norfolk State | 12 | – | 4 | .750 | 17 | – | 17 | .500 |
| Morgan State | 11 | – | 5 | .688 | 14 | – | 16 | .467 |
| Hampton | 11 | – | 5 | .688 | 14 | – | 17 | .452 |
| Savannah State* | 10 | – | 6 | .625 | 13 | – | 16 | .448 |
| MD Eastern Shore | 9 | – | 7 | .563 | 14 | – | 20 | .412 |
| South Carolina State | 7 | – | 9 | .438 | 11 | – | 20 | .355 |
| Delaware State | 7 | – | 9 | .438 | 10 | – | 22 | .313 |
| Coppin State | 7 | – | 9 | .438 | 8 | – | 24 | .250 |
| Bethune–Cookman | 6 | – | 10 | .375 | 10 | – | 22 | .313 |
| Howard | 5 | – | 11 | .313 | 10 | – | 24 | .294 |
| Florida A&M | 5 | – | 11 | .313 | 7 | – | 23 | .233 |
| North Carolina A&T | 1 | – | 15 | .063 | 3 | – | 29 | .094 |
† 2017 MEAC tournament winner *ineligible for postseason due to APR violations

The 2016–17 Savannah State Tigers basketball team represented Savannah State University during the 2016–17 NCAA Division I men's basketball season. The Tigers, led by 12th-year head coach Horace Broadnax, played their home games at Tiger Arena and were members of the Mid-Eastern Athletic Conference. They finished the season 13–16, 10–6 in MEAC play to finish in fifth place. The team was ineligible for postseason play due to APR violations.

== Previous season ==
They finished the 2015–16 season 16–16, 9–7 in MEAC play to finish in fifth place. They defeated Delaware State and Bethune–Cookman to advance to the semifinals of the MEAC tournament where they lost to Hampton. They were invited to the CollegeInsdier.com Tournament where they lost in the first round to Texas–Arlington.

== Preseason ==
The Eagles were picked to finish in 11th place in the preseason MEAC poll. Troyce Manassa was named to the preseason All-MEAC third team.

== Roster ==
2016–17 Savannah State Tigers men's basketball team
Players
Coaches

| Pos. | # | Name | Height | Weight | Year | Hometown |
|---|---|---|---|---|---|---|
| F | 00 | Robert Kelly, Jr. | 6 ft 7 in (2.01 m) | 195 lb (88 kg) | Fr | Powder Springs, Georgia |
| G | 1 | Austin Dasent | 6 ft 3 in (1.91 m) | 190 lb (86 kg) | Jr | Charlotte, North Carolina |
| G | 2 | Marlon Daniel | 6 ft 2 in (1.88 m) | 175 lb (79 kg) | Fr | Orlando, Florida |
| G | 3 | Zach Sellers | 6 ft 1 in (1.85 m) | 175 lb (79 kg) | Fr | Cheraw, South Carolina |
| G/F | 4 | Troyce Manassa | 6 ft 4 in (1.93 m) | 215 lb (98 kg) | Sr | Brooklyn, New York |
| F | 10 | Brandon Jordan | 6 ft 7 in (2.01 m) | 200 lb (91 kg) | Sr | Savannah, Georgia |
| G | 11 | Joshua Floyd | 6 ft 4 in (1.93 m) | 195 lb (88 kg) | Jr | Miramar, Florida |
| G/F | 12 | Casey Wells | 6 ft 3 in (1.91 m) | 180 lb (82 kg) | Sr | Atlanta, Georgia |
| F | 14 | Jordan Gaines | 6 ft 7 in (2.01 m) | 185 lb (84 kg) | Fr | East Point, Georgia |
| G | 15 | Isaiah Felder | 6 ft 0 in (1.83 m) | 180 lb (82 kg) | So | Orangeburg, South Carolina |
| G | 22 | Dexter McClanahan | 6 ft 5 in (1.96 m) | 185 lb (84 kg) | So | Stockbridge, Georgia |
| G/F | 30 | Jahir Cabeza | 6 ft 5 in (1.96 m) | 190 lb (86 kg) | Jr | Colón, Panama |
| C | 34 | Maricus Glenn | 6 ft 10 in (2.08 m) | 235 lb (107 kg) | Jr | Greensboro, Georgia |
| G | 50 | Kamil Williams | 6 ft 2 in (1.88 m) | 200 lb (91 kg) | So | Palm Beach, Florida |

Head coach

- Horace Broadnax (Georgetown)

Assistant coach(es)

- Clyde Wormley (The Citadel)
- Timothy "Pat" Hardy (Savannah State)
- Joseph Flegler (Savannah State)

Legend

- (C) Team captain
- (S) Suspended
- (I) Ineligible
- (W) Walk-on
- Injured
- Current redshirt

Roster
Last update: 2016-11-24

== Schedule ==
| Date time, TV | Opponent | Result | Record | Site (attendance) city, state |
Exhibition
| 11/03/2016*; 8:00 pm | LaGrange | W 100–86 | | Tiger Arena; Savannah, GA |
| 11/07/2016*; 8:00 pm | Armstrong State | W 123–108 | | Tiger Arena (3,147); Savannah, GA |
Non-conference regular season
| 11/11/2016*; 8:00 pm | at No. 24 Iowa State | L 71–113 | 0–1 | Hilton Coliseum (14,384); Ames, IA |
| 11/13/2016*; 3:30 pm, BTN+ | at Iowa; Emerald Coast Classic | L 84–116 | 0–2 | Carver–Hawkeye Arena (11,371); Iowa City, IA |
| 11/17/2016*; 7:00 pm | Middle Georgia State | W 101–93 | 1–2 | Tiger Arena (1,134); Savannah, GA |
| 11/19/2016*; 12:00 pm, ESPN3 | at Memphis; Emerald Coast Classic | L 86–99 | 1–3 | FedExForum (8,689); Memphis, TN |
| 11/21/2016*; 7:00 pm | Fort Valley State | W 118–101 | 2–3 | Tiger Arena (1,344); Savannah, GA |
| 11/25/2016*; 12:00 pm | vs. St. Francis Brooklyn; Emerald Coast Classic | L 91–97 | 2–4 | The Arena at NWFSC (320); Niceville, FL |
| 11/26/2016*; 11:00 am | vs. Grambling State; Emerald Coast Classic | L 104–110 | 2–5 | The Arena at NWFSC (200); Niceville, FL |
| 11/28/2016*; 10:00 pm | at San Diego State | L 67–100 | 2–6 | Viejas Arena (12,414); San Diego, CA |
| 12/01/2016*; 8:00 pm | Georgia Southern | L 75–94 | 2–7 | Tiger Arena (3,708); Savannah, GA |
| 12/03/2016*; 6:00 pm, P12N | at No. 23 Oregon | L 59–128 | 2–8 | Matthew Knight Arena (6,447); Eugene, OR |
| 12/11/2016*; 6:00 pm, P12N | at Oregon State | W 93–90 ^{OT} | 3–8 | Gill Coliseum (4,268); Corvallis, OR |
| 12/19/2016*; 7:00 pm | at William & Mary | L 85–112 | 3–9 | Kaplan Arena (1,377); Williamsburg, VA |
| 12/29/2016*; 7:00 pm | at East Tennessee State | L 71–92 | 3–10 | Freedom Hall Civic Center (2,768); Johnson City, TN |
MEAC regular season
| 01/04/2017; 8:00 pm | Bethune–Cookman | W 104–91 | 4–10 (1–0) | Tiger Arena (901); Savannah, GA |
| 01/09/2017; 7:00 pm | at Hampton | L 80–84 | 4–11 (1–1) | Hampton Convocation Center (1,234); Hampton, VA |
| 01/11/2017; 7:30 pm | at Norfolk State | L 76–80 | 4–12 (1–2) | Joseph G. Echols Memorial Hall (1,512); Norfolk, VA |
| 01/14/2017; 6:00 pm | Florida A&M | W 93–88 | 5–12 (2–2) | Tiger Arena (2,350); Savannah, GA |
| 01/16/2017; 7:30 pm | at South Carolina State | W 86–82 | 6–12 (3–2) | SHM Memorial Center (488); Orangeburg, SC |
| 01/21/2017; 6:00 pm | Morgan State | W 74–61 | 7–12 (4–2) | Tiger Arena (1,230); Savannah, GA |
| 01/23/2017; 8:00 pm | Delaware State | W 94–79 | 8–12 (5–2) | Tiger Arena (1,520); Savannah, GA |
| 01/28/2017; 4:00 pm | at Howard | W 73–70 | 9–12 (6–2) | Burr Gymnasium (1,975); Washington, D.C. |
| 01/30/2017; 7:30 pm | at Maryland Eastern Shore | W 87–82 | 10–12 (7–2) | Hytche Athletic Center (1,783); Princess Anne, MD |
| 02/04/2017; 6:00 pm | Hampton | L 89–92 | 10–13 (7–3) | Tiger Arena (2,328); Savannah, GA |
| 02/06/2017; 8:00 pm | Norfolk State | L 87–92 | 10–14 (7–4) | Tiger Arena (1,305); Savannah, GA |
| 02/18/2017; 4:00 pm | at Morgan State | L 75–83 | 10–15 (7–5) | Talmadge L. Hill Field House (1,056); Baltimore, MD |
| 02/20/2017; 8:00 pm | Coppin State | L 83–84 | 10–16 (7–6) | Tiger Arena (1,630); Savannah, GA |
| 02/25/2017; 4:00 pm | at North Carolina A&T | W 110–91 | 11–16 (8–6) | Corbett Sports Center (1,002); Greensboro, NC |
| 02/27/2017; 7:30 pm | at North Carolina Central | W 74–73 | 12–16 (9–6) | McLendon–McDougald Gymnasium (2,276); Durham, NC |
| 03/02/2017; 8:00 pm | South Carolina State | W 95–88 | 13–16 (10–6) | Tiger Arena (2,300); Savannah, GA |
*Non-conference game. ^{#}Rankings from AP Poll. (#) Tournament seedings in parentheses. All times are in Eastern Time.
