= 2016–17 South Carolina State Bulldogs basketball team =

American college basketball season

2016–17 South Carolina State Bulldogs basketball
- Conference: Mid-Eastern Athletic Conference
- Record: 11–20 (7–9 MEAC)
- Head coach: Murray Garvin (4th season)
- Assistant coaches: Rio Pitt; Trevor Deloach
- Home arena: SHM Memorial Center

2016–17 MEAC men's basketball standings
	Conf.				Overall
Team	W		L	PCT	W		L	PCT
NC Central †	13	–	3	.813	25	–	9	.735
Norfolk State	12	–	4	.750	17	–	17	.500
Morgan State	11	–	5	.688	14	–	16	.467
Hampton	11	–	5	.688	14	–	17	.452
Savannah State*	10	–	6	.625	13	–	16	.448
MD Eastern Shore	9	–	7	.563	14	–	20	.412
South Carolina State	7	–	9	.438	11	–	20	.355
Delaware State	7	–	9	.438	10	–	22	.313
Coppin State	7	–	9	.438	8	–	24	.250
Bethune–Cookman	6	–	10	.375	10	–	22	.313
Howard	5	–	11	.313	10	–	24	.294
Florida A&M	5	–	11	.313	7	–	23	.233
North Carolina A&T	1	–	15	.063	3	–	29	.094
† 2017 MEAC tournament winner *ineligible for postseason due to APR violations

The 2016–17 South Carolina State Bulldogs basketball team represented South Carolina State University during the 2016–17 NCAA Division I men's basketball season. The Bulldogs, led by fourth-year head coach Murray Garvin, played their home games at the SHM Memorial Center as members of the Mid-Eastern Athletic Conference. They finished the season 11–20, 7–9 in MEAC play to finish in a three-way tie for seventh place. They defeated Florida A&M in the MEAC tournament before losing in the quarterfinals to Norfolk State.

== Previous season ==
The Bulldogs finished the 2015–16 season 19–15, 12–4 in MEAC play to finish in a tie for second place. They defeated Coppin State and Norfolk State to advance to the championship game of the MEAC tournament where they lost to Hampton. They were invited to the CollegeInsider.com Tournament where they lost in the first round to Grand Canyon.

== Preseason ==
The Bulldogs were picked to finish in second place in the preseason MEAC poll. Eric Eaves was named to the preseason All-MEAC first team and Edward Stephens was named to the second team.

== Roster ==
2016–17 South Carolina State Bulldogs men's basketball team
Players
Coaches

Pos.	#	Name	Height	Weight	Year	Hometown
G/F	0	Earnest "LB" Jones	6 ft 6 in (1.98 m)	215 lb (98 kg)	Fr	Alexandria, Virginia
G	1	Edward Stephens	6 ft 2 in (1.88 m)	185 lb (84 kg)	Jr	Columbia, South Carolina
F	2	Tashombe Riley	6 ft 7 in (2.01 m)	200 lb (91 kg)	Jr	Orangeburg, South Carolina
G	3	Greg Mortimer	6 ft 3 in (1.91 m)	190 lb (86 kg)	Sr	Savannah, Georgia
F	5	Ozante Fields	6 ft 7 in (2.01 m)	215 lb (98 kg)	Fr	Denmark, South Carolina
G	10	James "JJ" Richardson	6 ft 2 in (1.88 m)	185 lb (84 kg)	Jr	Darlington, South Carolina
G	11	Janai Raynor Powell	5 ft 11 in (1.8 m)	160 lb (73 kg)	So	Virginia Beach, Virginia
G	20	Bobby Williams	6 ft 1 in (1.85 m)	170 lb (77 kg)	Sr	Kingstree, South Carolina
F	21	David Bottenberg	6 ft 8 in (2.03 m)	230 lb (104 kg)	Fr	Rockville, Maryland
G	22	Eric Eaves	6 ft 3 in (1.91 m)	195 lb (88 kg)	Sr	Columbia, South Carolina
F	24	Ian Kinard	6 ft 8 in (2.03 m)	230 lb (104 kg)	Fr	Clinton, South Carolina
F	34	Jaylen Reid	6 ft 7 in (2.01 m)	205 lb (93 kg)	Jr	Rock Hill, South Carolina
F	35	Damani Applewhite	6 ft 8 in (2.03 m)	195 lb (88 kg)	Fr	Fayetteville, North Carolina

Head coach

- Murray Garvin (Eastern Kentucky)

Assistant coach(es)

- Rio Pitt (South Carolina State)
- Trevor Deloach (UNC-Wilmington)

Legend

- (C) Team captain
- (S) Suspended
- (I) Ineligible
- (W) Walk-on
- Injured
- Current redshirt

Roster

== Schedule and results ==
Date time, TV	Rank^{#}	Opponent^{#}	Result	Record	Site (attendance) city, state
Non-conference regular season
11/11/2016*; 9:30 pm		at Wichita State	L 39–85	0–1	Charles Koch Arena (10,506); Wichita, KS
11/14/2016*; 7:00 pm		St. Andrews	W 93–76	1–1	SHM Memorial Center (392); Orangeburg, SC
11/18/2016*; 6:30 pm		at South Carolina; Brooklyn Hoops Holiday Invitational	L 50–92	1–2	Colonial Life Arena (10,159); Columbia, SC
11/22/2016*; 6:30 pm, ACCN Extra		at No. 18 Syracuse; Brooklyn Hoops Holiday Invitational	L 59–101	1–3	Carrier Dome (17,073); Syracuse, NY
11/25/2016*; 1:00 pm		at Holy Cross; Brooklyn Hoops Holiday Invitational	L 57–73	1–4	Hart Center (1,554); Worcester, MA
11/26/2016*; 1:00 pm		vs. Monmouth; Brooklyn Hoops Holiday Invitational	L 62–86	1–5	Hart Center (530); Worcester, MA
11/30/2016*; 7:00 pm		Voorhees	W 90–85	2–5	SHM Memorial Center (412); Orangeburg, SC
12/06/2016*; 7:00 pm, ACCN Extra		at Miami (FL)	L 46–82	2–6	Watsco Center (6,489); Coral Gables, FL
12/10/2016*; 8:00 pm, SECN		at Texas A&M	L 76–83	2–7	Reed Arena (6,934); College Station, TX
12/13/2016*; 7:00 pm, ESPNU		at Clemson	L 65–93	2–8	Littlejohn Coliseum (6,333); Clemson, SC
12/16/2016*; 7:00 pm		at Furman	W 69–67	3–8	Timmons Arena (1,008); Greenville, SC
12/22/2016*; 10:00 pm, TheW.tv		at No. 19 Saint Mary's	L 47–74	3–9	McKeon Pavilion (2,813); Moraga, CA
12/31/2016*; 12:00 pm, ESPN3		at Jacksonville	L 85–89	3–10	Swisher Gymnasium (450); Jacksonville, FL
MEAC regular season
01/04/2017; 7:30 pm		at Coppin State	L 59–75	3–11 (0–1)	Physical Education Complex (580); Baltimore, MD
01/14/2017; 4:00 pm		Bethune–Cookman	W 78–74	4–11 (1–1)	SHM Memorial Center (392); Orangeburg, SC
01/16/2017; 7:30 pm		Savannah State	L 82–86	4–12 (1–2)	SHM Memorial Center (488); Orangeburg, SC
01/21/2017; 4:00 pm		Delaware State	W 74–64	5–12 (2–2)	SHM Memorial Center (608); Orangeburg, SC
01/23/2017; 7:30 pm		Morgan State	L 75–77	5–13 (2–3)	SHM Memorial Center (432); Orangeburg, SC
01/25/2017; 7:30 pm		at Hampton	W 68–66	6–13 (3–3)	Hampton Convocation Center (3,214); Hampton, VA
01/28/2017; 4:00 pm		at Maryland Eastern Shore	L 69–92	6–14 (3–4)	Hytche Athletic Center (1,461); Princess Anne, MD
01/30/2017; 7:30 pm		at Howard	W 77–68	7–14 (4–4)	Burr Gymnasium (2,703); Washington, D.C.
02/04/2017; 4:00 pm		Norfolk State	L 62–65	7–15 (4–5)	SHM Memorial Center (312); Orangeburg, SC
02/06/2017; 7:30 pm		Hampton	L 64–93	7–16 (4–6)	SHM Memorial Center (487); Orangeburg, SC
02/11/2017; 4:00 pm		at North Carolina Central	L 62–85	7–17 (4–7)	McLendon–McDougald Gymnasium (1,639); Durham, NC
02/13/2017; 7:30 pm		at North Carolina A&T	W 72–65	8–17 (5–7)	Corbett Sports Center (1,006); Greensboro, NC
02/15/2017; 8:00 pm		at Norfolk State	L 70–81	8–18 (5–8)	Joseph G. Echols Memorial Hall (1,012); Norfolk, VA
02/18/2017; 4:00 pm		Coppin State	W 84–79	9–18 (6–8)	SHM Memorial Center (380); Orangeburg, SC
02/25/2017; 4:00 pm		Florida A&M	W 75–64	10–18 (7–8)	SHM Memorial Center (503); Orangeburg, SC
03/02/2017; 7:30 pm		at Savannah State	L 88–95	10–19 (7–9)	Tiger Arena (2,300); Savannah, GA
MEAC tournament
03/07/2017; 6:00 pm	(7)	vs. (10) Florida A&M; First round	L 78–82 ^{OT}	11–19	Norfolk Scope; Norfolk, VA
03/06/2017	(7)	vs. (2) Norfolk State; Quarterfinals	L 88–93 ^{OT}	11–20	Norfolk Scope; Norfolk, VA
*Non-conference game. ^{#}Rankings from AP Poll. (#) Tournament seedings in parentheses. All times are in Eastern Time.
