= 2016–17 Coppin State Eagles men's basketball team =

American college basketball season

2016–17 Coppin State Eagles men's basketball
- Conference: Mid-Eastern Athletic Conference
- Record: 8–24 (7–9 MEAC)
- Head coach: Michael Grant (3rd season)
- Assistant coaches: Elwyn McRoy; Keith Brown; Stephen Stewart
- Home arena: Physical Education Complex

2016–17 MEAC men's basketball standings
	Conf.				Overall
Team	W		L	PCT	W		L	PCT
NC Central †	13	–	3	.813	25	–	9	.735
Norfolk State	12	–	4	.750	17	–	17	.500
Morgan State	11	–	5	.688	14	–	16	.467
Hampton	11	–	5	.688	14	–	17	.452
Savannah State*	10	–	6	.625	13	–	16	.448
MD Eastern Shore	9	–	7	.563	14	–	20	.412
South Carolina State	7	–	9	.438	11	–	20	.355
Delaware State	7	–	9	.438	10	–	22	.313
Coppin State	7	–	9	.438	8	–	24	.250
Bethune–Cookman	6	–	10	.375	10	–	22	.313
Howard	5	–	11	.313	10	–	24	.294
Florida A&M	5	–	11	.313	7	–	23	.233
North Carolina A&T	1	–	15	.063	3	–	29	.094
† 2017 MEAC tournament winner *ineligible for postseason due to APR violations

The 2016–17 Coppin State Eagles men's basketball team represented Coppin State University during the 2016–17 NCAA Division I men's basketball season. The Eagles, led by third-year head coach Michael Grant, played their home games at the Physical Education Complex in Baltimore, Maryland as members of the Mid-Eastern Athletic Conference. They finished the season 8–24, 7–9 in MEAC play to finish in a three-way tie for seventh place. They lost in the first round of the MEAC tournament to Howard.

On March 20, 2017, it was announced that head coach Michael Grant's contract would not be renewed. He finished at Coppin State with a three-year record of 25–69. The school hired Baltimore native and former Maryland All-American player Juan Dixon as the new head coach on April 22.

== Previous season ==
The Eagles finished the 2015–16 season 9–22, 6–10 in MEAC play to finish in a three-way tie for ninth place. They defeated North Carolina A&T in the first round of the MEAC tournament to advance to the quarterfinals where they lost to South Carolina State.

== Preseason ==
The Eagles were picked to finish in 10th place in the preseason MEAC poll. Terry Harris, Jr. was named to the preseason All-MEAC third team.

== Roster ==
2016–17 Coppin State Eagles men's basketball team
Players
Coaches

Pos.	#	Name	Height	Weight	Year	Hometown
G	0	Rasool Hinson	6 ft 3 in (1.91 m)	180 lb (82 kg)	RS Fr	Camden	Camden, New Jersey
F/C	1	Chas Brown	6 ft 8 in (2.03 m)	240 lb (109 kg)	Sr	Baltimore CC; Albany	Baltimore, Maryland
G	2	Juwan Davenport	6 ft 3 in (1.91 m)	175 lb (79 kg)	RS Fr	N/A	Charlotte, North Carolina
G/F	3	Joshua Treadwell	6 ft 5 in (1.96 m)	213 lb (97 kg)	Sr	Essex County CC	Newark, New Jersey
G	4	Tre' Thomas	6 ft 3 in (1.91 m)	180 lb (82 kg)	Jr	Riverdale Baptist School; Baltimore City CC	Largo, Maryland
F	11	Izais Hicks	6 ft 8 in (2.03 m)	200 lb (91 kg)	Sr	Northwest Tech	Staten Island, New York
G	13	Dejuan Clayton	6 ft 2 in (1.88 m)	175 lb (79 kg)	Fr	St. John's College	Bowie, Maryland
F	15	Blake Simpson	6 ft 7 in (2.01 m)	230 lb (104 kg)	Jr	Cincinnati La Salle	Cincinnati, Ohio
G	21	Lucian Brownlee	6 ft 2 in (1.88 m)	165 lb (75 kg)	So	Haddon Heights	Lawnside, New Jersey
G	22	Keith Shivers	6 ft 4 in (1.93 m)	195 lb (88 kg)	Sr	Dr. Henry A. Wise, Jr. HS; Paris JC	Upper Marlboro, Maryland
G	23	Joseph Gripper	6 ft 1 in (1.85 m)	175 lb (79 kg)	Sr	Abington Friends School; Highland CC (IL)	Philadelphia, Pennsylvania
F	25	Terry Harris Jr.	6 ft 8 in (2.03 m)	205 lb (93 kg)	Sr	Kenwood (MD); Baltimore CC	Baltimore, Maryland
F	35	Mufaro Murinda	6 ft 7 in (2.01 m)	195 lb (88 kg)	Sr	Chaffey College	Pomona, California

Head coach

- Michael Grant (Malone)

Assistant coach(es)

- Elwyn McRoy (Cleveland State)
- Keith Brown (Hampton)
- Stephen Stewart (Coppin State)

Legend

- (C) Team captain
- (S) Suspended
- (I) Ineligible
- (W) Walk-on
- Injured
- Current redshirt

Roster

== Schedule and results ==
Date time, TV	Rank^{#}	Opponent^{#}	Result	Record	Site (attendance) city, state
Non-conference regular season
11/11/2016*; 7:30 pm		at Hofstra	L 72–74	0–1	Mack Sports Complex (1,684); Hempstead, NY
11/14/2016*; 7:00 pm		at Valparaiso; Men Who Speak Up Main Event	L 58–78	0–2	Athletics–Recreation Center (1,972); Valparaiso, IN
11/16/2016*; 7:00 pm		at Coastal Carolina; Men Who Speak Up Main Event	L 59–89	0–3	HTC Center (1,754); Conway, SC
11/17/2016*; 9:00 pm, BYUtv		at BYU; Men Who Speak Up Main Event	L 59–96	0–4	Marriott Center (12,444); Provo, Utah
11/18/2016*; 6:00 pm, P12N		at Utah	L 51–94	0–5	Jon M. Huntsman Center (10,693); Salt Lake City, UT
11/21/2016*; 3:30 pm		vs. Ball State; Men Who Speak Up Main Event	L 77–79	0–6	MGM Grand Garden Arena; Paradise, NV
11/25/2016*; 10:00 pm		at Grand Canyon	L 37–70	0–7	GCU Arena (7,258); Phoenix, AZ
11/28/2016*; 7:30 pm		Chestnut Hill	L 73–76	0–8	Physical Education Complex (1,200); Baltimore, MD
11/30/2016*; 6:30 pm, FSN/MASN2		at Georgetown	L 44–96	0–9	Verizon Center (3,996); Washington, D.C.
12/04/2016*; 2:00 pm, ACC Extra		at Clemson	L 43–85	0–10	Littlejohn Coliseum (6,711); Clemson, SC
12/07/2016*; 7:00 pm		at Akron	L 63–87	0–11	James A. Rhodes Arena (2,948); Akron, OH
12/10/2016*; 2:00 pm		at Buffalo	L 52–87	0–12	Alumni Arena (3,457); Amherst, NY
12/15/2016*; 7:30 pm		Goldey–Beacom	W 89–83	1–12	Physical Education Complex (788); Baltimore, MD
12/20/2016*; 2:00 pm		Louisiana–Monroe	L 53–65	1–13	Physical Education Complex (355); Baltimore, MD
12/22/2016*; 7:00 pm		at Mount St. Mary's	L 49–87	1–14	Knott Arena (1,080); Emmitsburg, MD
MEAC regular season
01/04/2017; 7:30 pm		South Carolina State	W 75–59	2–14 (1–0)	Physical Education Complex (580); Baltimore, MD
01/07/2017; 6:00 pm		at Florida A&M	L 53–54	2–15 (1–1)	Teaching Gym (972); Tallahassee, FL
01/09/2017; 7:30 pm		at Bethune–Cookman	W 76–73	3–15 (2–1)	Moore Gymnasium (711); Daytona Beach, FL
01/14/2017; 4:00 pm		North Carolina A&T	W 75–73 ^{OT}	4–15 (3–1)	Physical Education Complex (533); Baltimore, MD
01/16/2017; 7:00 pm		at Howard	W 81–72	5–15 (4–1)	Burr Gymnasium (834); Washington, D.C.
01/23/2017; 7:30 pm		Norfolk State	L 64–74	5–16 (4–2)	Physical Education Complex (677); Baltimore, MD
01/28/2017; 4:00 pm		Morgan State	L 74–76	5–17 (4–3)	Physical Education Complex (1,899); Baltimore, MD
01/30/2017; 7:00 pm		at Hampton	L 65–77	5–18 (4–4)	Hampton Convocation Center (2,487); Hampton, VA
02/04/2017; 7:30 pm		at Maryland Eastern Shore	L 57–78	5–19 (4–5)	Hytche Athletic Center (2,029); Princess Anne, MD
02/06/2017; 7:30 pm		North Carolina Central	L 77–86	5–20 (4–6)	Physical Education Complex (788); Baltimore, MD
02/11/2017; 4:00 pm		Bethune–Cookman	W 76–72	6–20 (5–6)	Physical Education Complex; Baltimore, MD
02/13/2017; 7:30 pm		Delaware State	W 83–75	7–20 (6–6)	Physical Education Complex (899); Baltimore, MD
02/18/2017; 4:00 pm		at South Carolina State	L 79–84	7–21 (6–7)	SHM Memorial Center (380); Orangeburg, SC
02/20/2017; 8:00 pm		at Savannah State	W 84–83	8–21 (7–7)	Tiger Arena (1,630); Savannah, GA
02/27/2017; 8:00 pm		at Morgan State	L 66–71	8–22 (7–8)	Talmadge L. Hill Field House (4,078); Baltimore, MD
02/27/2017; 7:30 pm		Hampton	L 82–89	8–23 (7–9)	Physical Education Complex (833); Baltimore, MD
MEAC tournament
03/06/2017; 7:00 pm	(6)	vs. (11) Howard; First round	L 73–79	8–24	Norfolk Scope; Norfolk, VA
*Non-conference game. ^{#}Rankings from AP Poll. (#) Tournament seedings in parentheses. All times are in Eastern Time. Source
