= 2016–17 Florida A&M Rattlers basketball team =

American college basketball season

2016–17 Florida A&M Rattlers basketball
- Conference: Mid-Eastern Athletic Conference
- Record: 7–23 (5–11 MEAC)
- Head coach: Byron Samuels (3rd season)
- Assistant coaches: Lamont Franklin; Alphonza Kee; Bruce Martin
- Home arena: Teaching Gym

2016–17 MEAC men's basketball standings
	Conf.				Overall
Team	W		L	PCT	W		L	PCT
NC Central †	13	–	3	.813	25	–	9	.735
Norfolk State	12	–	4	.750	17	–	17	.500
Morgan State	11	–	5	.688	14	–	16	.467
Hampton	11	–	5	.688	14	–	17	.452
Savannah State*	10	–	6	.625	13	–	16	.448
MD Eastern Shore	9	–	7	.563	14	–	20	.412
South Carolina State	7	–	9	.438	11	–	20	.355
Delaware State	7	–	9	.438	10	–	22	.313
Coppin State	7	–	9	.438	8	–	24	.250
Bethune–Cookman	6	–	10	.375	10	–	22	.313
Howard	5	–	11	.313	10	–	24	.294
Florida A&M	5	–	11	.313	7	–	23	.233
North Carolina A&T	1	–	15	.063	3	–	29	.094
† 2017 MEAC tournament winner *ineligible for postseason due to APR violations

The 2016–17 Florida A&M Rattlers men's basketball team represented Florida A&M University during the 2016–17 NCAA Division I men's basketball season. The Rattlers, led by third-year head coach Byron Samuels, played their home games at the Teaching Gym as members of the Mid-Eastern Athletic Conference. They finished the season 7–23, 5–11 in MEAC play to finish in a tie for 11th place. They lost in the first round of the MEAC tournament to South Carolina State.

On March 17, 2017, it was announced that head coach Byron Samuels' contract would not be renewed. He finished at Florida A&M with a three-year record of 17–71. On May 16, the school named Oregon assistant Robert McCullum as their new head coach. McCullum had previous head coaching jobs at Western Michigan and South Florida.

== Previous season ==
The Rattlers finished the 2015–16 season 8–21, 4–12 record in MEAC play to finish last in the conference. They were ineligible for the postseason due to APR violations.

== Preseason ==
The Rattlers were picked to finish in last place in the preseason MEAC poll.

== Roster ==
2016–17 Florida A&M Rattlers men's basketball team
Players
Coaches

Pos.	#	Name	Height	Weight	Year	Hometown
F	0	Desmond Williams	6 ft 6 in (1.98 m)	200 lb (91 kg)	Jr	Atmore, Alabama
G	1	Nick Severado	6 ft 8 in (2.03 m)	190 lb (86 kg)	So	Savannah, Georgia
F	2	Trey-Cary Warren	6 ft 8 in (2.03 m)	235 lb (107 kg)	Sr	Norfolk, Virginia
PG	3	Craig Bowman	6 ft 3 in (1.91 m)	175 lb (79 kg)	Jr	St. Petersburg, Florida
G	4	Elijah Mays	6 ft 0 in (1.83 m)	170 lb (77 kg)	Sr	Orlando, Florida
G	5	Nasir Core	6 ft 1 in (1.85 m)	195 lb (88 kg)	Fr	Tampa, Florida
C	12	Andrew Smith	6 ft 10 in (2.08 m)	260 lb (118 kg)	So	Johnson City, Tennessee
F	14	Derrick Dandridge	6 ft 8 in (2.03 m)	230 lb (104 kg)	Jr	Memphis, Tennessee
G	20	Brendon Myles	6 ft 4 in (1.93 m)	185 lb (84 kg)	Fr	Atlanta, Georgia
G	21	Justin Ravenel	6 ft 1 in (1.85 m)	175 lb (79 kg)	So	Lithonia, Georgia
G	22	Marcus Barham	6 ft 4 in (1.93 m)	180 lb (82 kg)	Jr	Melbourne, Florida
F	23	Leon Williams	6 ft 7 in (2.01 m)	205 lb (93 kg)	So	Fayetteville, North Carolina
F	30	Rashad Austin	6 ft 8 in (2.03 m)	205 lb (93 kg)	Fr	Tampa, Florida
G	32	K'Ja Johnson	6 ft 1 in (1.85 m)	175 lb (79 kg)	So	Douglasville, Georgia

Head coach

- Byron Samuels (Tennessee)

Assistant coach(es)

- Lamont Franklin (UNC-Wilmington)
- Alphonza Kee (Fayetteville State)
- Bruce Martin (Clemson)

Legend

- (C) Team captain
- (S) Suspended
- (I) Ineligible
- (W) Walk-on
- Injured
- Current redshirt

Roster

== Schedule and results ==
Date time, TV	Rank^{#}	Opponent^{#}	Result	Record	Site (attendance) city, state
Non-conference regular season
11/11/2016*; 7:00 pm, ESPN3		at South Florida	L 73–84	0–1	USF Sun Dome (3,106); Tampa, FL
11/15/2016*; 7:00 pm		Trinity Baptist	W 94–62	1–1	Teaching Gym (897); Tallahassee, FL
11/17/2016*; 7:00 pm		Johnson (FL)	W 100–91	2–1	Teaching Gym; Tallahassee, FL
11/20/2016*; 4:00 pm		at Air Force; Savannah Invitational	W 87–62	2–2	Clune Arena (836); Colorado Springs, CO
11/22/2016*; 7:00 pm, ESPN3		at East Carolina; Savannah Invitational	L 62–82	2–3	Williams Arena at Minges Coliseum (3,341); Greenville, NC
11/25/2016*; 2:30 pm		vs. Georgia Southern; Savannah Invitational	L 72–83	2–4	Savannah Civic Center (491); Savannah, GA
11/26/2016*; 12:00 pm		vs. Stetson; Savannah Invitational	L 90–98	2–5	Savannah Civic Center; Savannah, GA
11/30/2016*; 7:00 pm, ESPN3		Kennesaw State	L 74–76	2–6	Teaching Gym (579); Tallahassee, FL
12/03/2016*; 4:00 pm		Southern	L 71–83	2–7	Teaching Gym (1,017); Tallahassee, FL
12/12/2016*; 8:00 pm		at Southeastern Louisiana	L 69–108	2–8	University Center (488); Hammond, LA
12/17/2016*; 4:00 pm		Jacksonville	L 72–75	2–9	Teaching Gym (678); Tallahassee, FL
12/22/2016*; 7:00 pm		at Samford	L 63–83	2–10	Pete Hanna Center (1,069); Birmingham, AL
12/23/2016*; 8:00 pm, BTN		at No. 14 Wisconsin	L 37–90	2–11	Kohl Center (17,287); Madison, WI
MEAC regular season
01/04/2017; 7:00 pm		at Howard	W 78–66	3–11 (1–0)	Burr Gymnasium (534); Washington, D.C.
01/07/2017; 6:00 pm		Coppin State	W 54–53	4–12 (2–0)	Teaching Gym (972); Tallahassee, FL
01/10/2017; 7:00 pm		at Morgan State	L 59–62	4–12 (2–1)	Teaching Gym (1,317); Tallahassee, FL
01/14/2017; 6:00 pm		at Savannah State	L 88–93	4–13 (2–2)	Tiger Arena (2,350); Savannah, GA
01/16/2017; 4:00 pm		Bethune–Cookman	L 76–82	4–14 (2–3)	Teaching Gym (4,878); Tallahassee, FL
01/23/2017; 8:00 pm		Maryland Eastern Shore	L 79–86	4–15 (2–4)	Teaching Gym (1,479); Tallahassee, FL
01/28/2017; 4:00 pm		at Delaware State	L 68–81	5–15 (3–4)	Memorial Hall (1,279); Dover, DE
01/30/2017; 7:30 pm		at Morgan State	L 60–77	5–16 (3–5)	Talmadge L. Hill Field House (1,007); Baltimore, MD
02/04/2017; 6:00 pm		Howard	W 71–62	6–16 (4–5)	Teaching Gym (2,179); Tallahassee, FL
02/06/2017; 8:00 pm		Delaware State	L 77–80 ^{OT}	6–17 (4–6)	Teaching Gym (2,278); Tallahassee, FL
02/11/2017; 4:00 pm		at North Carolina A&T	W 83–77	7–17 (5–6)	Corbett Sports Center (1,286); Greensboro, NC
02/13/2017; 7:30 pm		at North Carolina Central	L 73–78	7–18 (5–7)	McLendon–McDougald Gymnasium (986); Durham, NC
02/18/2017; 6:00 pm		Norfolk State	L 65–77 ^{2OT}	7–19 (5–8)	Teaching Gym (1,245); Tallahassee, FL
02/20/2017; 8:00 pm		Hampton	L 69–76	7–20 (5–9)	Teaching Gym (1,145); Tallahassee, FL
02/25/2017; 4:00 pm		at South Carolina State	L 64–75	7–21 (5–10)	SHM Memorial Center (503); Orangeburg, SC
03/02/2017; 7:00 pm		at Bethune–Cookman	L 59–69	7–22 (5–11)	Moore Gymnasium; Daytona Beach, FL
MEAC tournament
03/07/2017; 6:00 pm	(10)	vs. (7) South Carolina State; First Round	L 78–82 ^{OT}	7–23	Norfolk Scope; Norfolk, VA
*Non-conference game. ^{#}Rankings from AP Poll. (#) Tournament seedings in parentheses. All times are in Eastern Time.
