= 2016–17 Norfolk State Spartans men's basketball team =

American college basketball season

2016–17 Norfolk State Spartans men's basketball
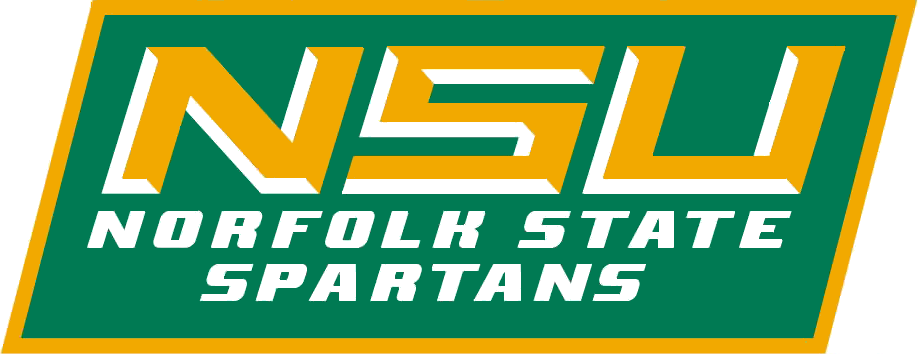

CIT, First Round
- Conference: Mid-Eastern Athletic Conference
- Record: 17–17 (12–4 MEAC)
- Head coach: Robert Jones (4th season)
- Assistant coaches: Kevin Jones; C.J. Clemons; Jamal Brown
- Home arena: Joseph G. Echols Memorial Hall

2016–17 MEAC men's basketball standings
	Conf.				Overall
Team	W		L	PCT	W		L	PCT
NC Central †	13	–	3	.813	25	–	9	.735
Norfolk State	12	–	4	.750	17	–	17	.500
Morgan State	11	–	5	.688	14	–	16	.467
Hampton	11	–	5	.688	14	–	17	.452
Savannah State*	10	–	6	.625	13	–	16	.448
MD Eastern Shore	9	–	7	.563	14	–	20	.412
South Carolina State	7	–	9	.438	11	–	20	.355
Delaware State	7	–	9	.438	10	–	22	.313
Coppin State	7	–	9	.438	8	–	24	.250
Bethune–Cookman	6	–	10	.375	10	–	22	.313
Howard	5	–	11	.313	10	–	24	.294
Florida A&M	5	–	11	.313	7	–	23	.233
North Carolina A&T	1	–	15	.063	3	–	29	.094
† 2017 MEAC tournament winner *ineligible for postseason due to APR violations

The 2016–17 Norfolk State Spartans men's basketball team represented Norfolk State University during the 2016–17 NCAA Division I men's basketball season. The Spartans, led by fourth-year coach Robert Jones, played their home games at the Joseph G. Echols Memorial Hall as members of the Mid-Eastern Athletic Conference. They finished the season 17–17, 12–4 in MEAC play to finish in second place. They defeated South Carolina State and Howard to advance to the championship game of the MEAC tournament where they lost to North Carolina Central. They were invited to the CollegeInsider.com Tournament, where they lost in the first round to Liberty.

== Previous season ==
The Spartans finished the 2015–16 season 17–17, 12–4 in MEAC play to finish in a tie for second place. They defeated North Carolina Central in the quarterfinals of the MEAC tournament to advance to the semifinals where they lost to South Carolina State. The Spartans received an invitation to the CollegeInsider.com Tournament where they lost in the first round to Columbia.

== Preseason ==
The Spartans were picked to finish in fifth place in the preseason MEAC poll. Jordan Butler was named to the preseason All-MEAC third team.

== Roster ==
2016–17 Norfolk State Spartans men's basketball team
Players
Coaches

Pos.	#	Name	Height	Weight	Year	Hometown
G	0	Carrington Ward	6 ft 2 in (1.88 m)	170 lb (77 kg)	RS Sr	Philadelphia, Pennsylvania
G/F	1	Preston Bungei	6 ft 6 in (1.98 m)	180 lb (82 kg)	Sr	Albuquerque, New Mexico
G	2	Zaynah Robinson	5 ft 11 in (1.8 m)	180 lb (82 kg)	Jr	Atlanta, Georgia
G	3	Jonathan Wade	6 ft 4 in (1.93 m)	190 lb (86 kg)	RS Sr	Panama City, Florida
G	4	Micah Goss	6 ft 3 in (1.91 m)	190 lb (86 kg)	RS Jr	Knoxville, Tennessee
C	5	Bryan Gellineau	6 ft 11 in (2.11 m)	280 lb (127 kg)	RS Jr	Amityville, New York
G	11	Kerwin Okoro	6 ft 4 in (1.93 m)	215 lb (98 kg)	RS Sr	Bronx, New York
G/F	13	Stavian Allen	6 ft 7 in (2.01 m)	200 lb (91 kg)	Jr	Cary, North Carolina
G	20	Alex Brown	6 ft 3 in (1.91 m)	180 lb (82 kg)	Jr	Mullins, South Carolina
F	22	Alex Long	6 ft 8 in (2.03 m)	210 lb (95 kg)	So	Clinton, Maryland
G	24	Kyle Williams	6 ft 4 in (1.93 m)	185 lb (84 kg)	RS Jr	Bronx, New York
G	34	Steven Whitley (I) (redshirt)	6 ft 3 in (1.91 m)	225 lb (102 kg)	So	Norfolk, Virginia
C	44	Dan Robinson	7 ft 0 in (2.13 m)	215 lb (98 kg)	RS Jr	Norfolk, Virginia
F	45	Jordan Butler	6 ft 6 in (1.98 m)	240 lb (109 kg)	Jr	Hartford, Connecticut

Head coach

- Robert Jones (SUNY New Paltz)

Assistant coach(es)

- Kevin Jones (Bowie State)
- C.J. Clemons (Norfolk State)
- Jamal Brown (South Carolina State)

Legend

- (C) Team captain
- (S) Suspended
- (I) Ineligible
- (W) Walk-on
- Injured
- Current redshirt

Roster

== Schedule and results ==
Date time, TV	Rank^{#}	Opponent^{#}	Result	Record	Site city, state
Exhibition
11/05/2016*; 6:00 pm		at Virginia State	L 80–83 ^{2OT}		Multi-Purpose Center; Ettrick, VA
Non-conference regular season
11/11/2016; 8:00 pm, SECN+		at Mississippi State	L 74–78	0–1	Humphrey Coliseum (4,467); Starkville, MS
11/13/2016*; 7:15 pm		Shenandoah	W 78–58	1–1	Joseph G. Echols Memorial Hall (3,018); Norfolk, VA
11/15/2016*; 8:00 pm		Elizabeth City State	W 91–55	2–1	Joseph G. Echols Memorial Hall (2,519); Norfolk, VA
11/18/2016*; 8:00 pm, SECN+		at Vanderbilt; Las Vegas Invitational	L 52–75	2–2	Memorial Gymnasium (8,205); Nashville, TN
11/21/2016*; 8:30 pm, FS1		at Butler; Las Vegas Invitational	L 55–91	2–3	Hinkle Fieldhouse (6,593); Indianapolis, IN
11/24/2016*; 2:30 pm		vs. Bucknell; Las Vegas Invitational	L 58–84	2–4	Orleans Arena; Paradise, NV
11/25/2016*; 2:30 pm		vs. Sacred Heart; Las Vegas Invitational	L 59–61	2–5	Orleans Arena; Paradise, NV
11/30/2016*; 8:00 pm, ESPN3		at Loyola–Chicago	L 62–75	2–6	Joseph J. Gentile Arena (1,118); Chicago, IL
12/03/2016*; 6:00 pm		Northern Kentucky	L 61–72	2–7	Joseph G. Echols Memorial Hall (1,261); Norfolk, VA
12/10/2016*; 3:00 pm		at Niagara	L 61–65	2–8	Gallagher Center (1,242); Lewiston, NY
12/14/2016*; 8:00 pm, ESPN3		at Evansville	L 66–85	2–9	Ford Center (3,312); Evansville, IN
12/19/2016*; 7:00 pm		Eastern Kentucky	W 87–80 ^{OT}	3–9	Joseph G. Echols Memorial Hall (621); Norfolk, VA
12/21/2016*; 7:00 pm, BTN+		at No. 15 Purdue	L 45–91	3–10	Mackey Arena (11,376); West Lafayette, IN
12/30/2016*; 2:00 pm		at Bowling Green	L 77–86	3–11	Stroh Center (1,820); Bowling Green, OH
MEAC regular season
01/04/2017; 7:30 pm		at Morgan State	L 56–58	3–12 (0–1)	Talmadge L. Hill Field House (974); Baltimore, MD
01/11/2017; 6:30 pm		Savannah State	W 80–76	4–12 (1–1)	Joseph G. Echols Memorial Hall (1,512); Norfolk, VA
01/14/2017; 6:30 pm		North Carolina Central	L 57–72	4–13 (1–2)	Joseph G. Echols Memorial Hall (2,064); Norfolk, VA
01/16/2017; 7:30 pm		at Delaware State	W 75–70	5–13 (2–2)	Memorial Hall (1,067); Dover, DE
01/21/2017; 6:30 pm		Hampton	W 79–62	6–13 (3–2)	Joseph G. Echols Memorial Hall (4,828); Norfolk, VA
01/23/2017; 7:30 pm		at Coppin State	W 74–64	7–13 (4–2)	Physical Education Complex (677); Baltimore, MD
01/28/2017; 6:30 pm		Bethune–Cookman	W 73–66	8–13 (5–2)	Joseph G. Echols Memorial Hall (2,512); Norfolk, VA
01/30/2017; 8:00 pm		North Carolina A&T	W 83–69	9–13 (6–2)	Joseph G. Echols Memorial Hall (1,797); Norfolk, VA
02/04/2017; 4:00 pm		at South Carolina State	W 65–62	10–13 (7–2)	SHM Memorial Center (312); Orangeburg, SC
02/06/2017; 8:00 pm		at Savannah State	W 92–87	11–13 (8–2)	Tiger Arena (1,305); Savannah, GA
02/11/2017; 6:30 pm		Maryland Eastern Shore	W 75–69	12–13 (9–2)	Joseph G. Echols Memorial Hall (2,407); Norfolk, VA
02/15/2017; 8:00 pm		South Carolina State	W 81–70	13–13 (10–2)	Joseph G. Echols Memorial Hall (1,012); Norfolk, VA
02/18/2017; 6:00 pm		at Florida A&M	W 77–65	14–13 (11–2)	Teaching Gym (1,245); Tallahassee, FL
02/20/2017; 7:30 pm		at Bethune–Cookman	L 65–75	14–14 (11–3)	Moore Gymnasium (812); Daytona Beach, FL
02/25/2017; 6:30 pm		Howard	W 73–65	15–14 (12–3)	Joseph G. Echols Memorial Hall (2,832); Norfolk, VA
02/27/2017; 9:00 pm, ESPNU		at Hampton	L 59–63	15–15 (12–4)	Joseph G. Echols Memorial Hall (6,123); Norfolk, VA
MEAC tournament
03/08/2017; 8:00 pm, ESPN3	(2)	vs. (7) South Carolina State; Quarterfinals	W 93–88 ^{OT}	16–15	Norfolk Scope (7,233); Norfolk, VA
03/10/2017; 8:00 pm, ESPN3	(2)	vs. (11) Howard; Semifinals	W 68–53	17–15	Norfolk Scope (13,331); Norfolk, VA
03/11/2017; 1:00 pm, ESPN2	(2)	vs. (1) North Carolina Central; Championship game	L 58–67	17–16	Norfolk Scope (7,111); Norfolk, VA
CIT
03/13/2017*; 7:00 pm, Facebook Live		at Liberty; First Round; Coach John McLendon Classic	L 64–73	17–17	Vines Center (574); Lynchburg, VA
*Non-conference game. ^{#}Rankings from AP Poll. (#) Tournament seedings in parentheses. All times are in Eastern Time.
