= 2016–17 Maryland Eastern Shore Hawks men's basketball team =

American college basketball season

2016–17 Maryland Eastern Shore Hawks men's basketball
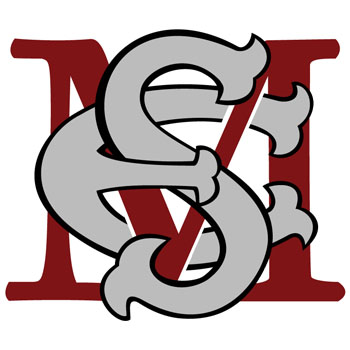
- Conference: Mid-Eastern Athletic Conference
- Record: 14–20 (9–7 MEAC)
- Head coach: Bobby Collins (3rd season)
- Assistant coaches: Clifford Reed; Ace Custis; Ed Huckaby
- Home arena: Hytche Athletic Center

2016–17 MEAC men's basketball standings
| | Conf. | | | | Overall |
| Team | W | | L | PCT | W | | L | PCT |
|---|---|---|---|---|---|---|---|---|
| NC Central † | 13 | – | 3 | .813 | 25 | – | 9 | .735 |
| Norfolk State | 12 | – | 4 | .750 | 17 | – | 17 | .500 |
| Morgan State | 11 | – | 5 | .688 | 14 | – | 16 | .467 |
| Hampton | 11 | – | 5 | .688 | 14 | – | 17 | .452 |
| Savannah State* | 10 | – | 6 | .625 | 13 | – | 16 | .448 |
| MD Eastern Shore | 9 | – | 7 | .563 | 14 | – | 20 | .412 |
| South Carolina State | 7 | – | 9 | .438 | 11 | – | 20 | .355 |
| Delaware State | 7 | – | 9 | .438 | 10 | – | 22 | .313 |
| Coppin State | 7 | – | 9 | .438 | 8 | – | 24 | .250 |
| Bethune–Cookman | 6 | – | 10 | .375 | 10 | – | 22 | .313 |
| Howard | 5 | – | 11 | .313 | 10 | – | 24 | .294 |
| Florida A&M | 5 | – | 11 | .313 | 7 | – | 23 | .233 |
| North Carolina A&T | 1 | – | 15 | .063 | 3 | – | 29 | .094 |
† 2017 MEAC tournament winner *ineligible for postseason due to APR violations

The 2016–17 Maryland Eastern Shore Hawks men's basketball team represented the University of Maryland Eastern Shore during the 2016–17 NCAA Division I men's basketball season. The Hawks, led by third-year head coach Bobby Collins, played their home games at Hytche Athletic Center as members of the Mid-Eastern Athletic Conference. They finished the season 14–20, 9–7 in MEAC play to finish in sixth place. They defeated North Carolina A&T and Bethune–Cookman in the MEAC tournament before losing in the semifinals to North Carolina Central.

== Previous season ==
The Hawks finished the 2015–16 season 10–22, 7–9 record in MEAC play to finish in a tie for fifth place. They lost to Morgan State in the first round of the MEAC tournament.

== Preseason ==
The Hawks were picked to finish in eighth place in the preseason MEAC poll. Bakari Copeland was named to the preseason All-MEAC second team.

== Roster ==
2016–17 Maryland Eastern Shore Hawks men's basketball team
Players
Coaches

| Pos. | # | Name | Height | Weight | Year | Hometown |
|---|---|---|---|---|---|---|
| G | 0 | Ryan Andino | 6 ft 2 in (1.88 m) | 175 lb (79 kg) | Jr | Fort Lauderdale, Florida |
| G | 1 | Marc Seylan | 6 ft 4 in (1.93 m) | 190 lb (86 kg) | Sr | Paris, France |
| G | 2 | Thomas Rivera | 5 ft 11 in (1.8 m) | 165 lb (75 kg) | Sr | Harlem, New York |
| G | 3 | Logan McIntosh | 6 ft 3 in (1.91 m) | 180 lb (82 kg) | Jr | Atlanta, Georgia |
| G | 4 | Colen Gaynor | 6 ft 5 in (1.96 m) | 185 lb (84 kg) | Fr | Berlin, Maryland |
| F | 5 | Deven Dorsett | 6 ft 6 in (1.98 m) | 190 lb (86 kg) | RS So | Lithonia, Georgia |
| G | 10 | Montraz Oliver | 6 ft 2 in (1.88 m) | 150 lb (68 kg) | Fr | Princess Anne, Maryland |
| G | 11 | Ahmad Frost | 6 ft 0 in (1.83 m) | 190 lb (86 kg) | So | Cincinnati, Ohio |
| G | 13 | Randell Pickett | 6 ft 2 in (1.88 m) | 185 lb (84 kg) | Jr | Louisville, Kentucky |
| F | 15 | Tyler Jones | 6 ft 7 in (2.01 m) | 200 lb (91 kg) | Fr | Atlantic City, New Jersey |
| G | 20 | Dontae Caldwell | 6 ft 5 in (1.96 m) | 195 lb (88 kg) | So | Santa Ana, California |
| F | 21 | Bakari Copeland | 6 ft 6 in (1.98 m) | 235 lb (107 kg) | Sr | Decatur, Georgia |
| G | 23 | Michael Chambers | 6 ft 3 in (1.91 m) | 186 lb (84 kg) | Jr | Winston-Salem, North Carolina |
| G | 24 | Derrico Peck | 6 ft 7 in (2.01 m) | 200 lb (91 kg) | GS | Atlanta, Georgia |
| F | 35 | Isaac Taylor | 6 ft 8 in (2.03 m) | 250 lb (113 kg) | So | Wachapreague, Virginia |

Head coach

- Bobby Collins (Eastern Kentucky)

Assistant coach(es)

- Clifford Reed (Bethune–Cookman)
- Adrian Custis (Virginia Tech)
- Ed Huckaby (Toledo)

Legend

- (C) Team captain
- (S) Suspended
- (I) Ineligible
- (W) Walk-on
- Injured
- Current redshirt

Roster

== Schedule and results ==
| Date time, TV | Rank^{#} | Opponent^{#} | Result | Record | Site (attendance) city, state |
Non-conference regular season
| 11/11/2016*; 7:00 pm | | at George Washington | L 71–75 | 0–1 | Charles E. Smith Center (3,256); Washington, D.C. |
| 11/13/2016*; 4:00 pm | | UMBC | L 73–77 | 0–2 | Hytche Athletic Center (1,364); Princess Anne, MD |
| 11/15/2016*; 7:00 pm, ACCN Extra | | at Boston College | L 57–73 | 0–3 | Conte Forum (2,051); Chestnut Hill, MA |
| 11/20/2016*; 3:00 pm, ESPN3 | | at Wichita State | L 79–116 | 0–4 | Charles Koch Arena (10,506); Wichita, KS |
| 11/23/2016*; 2:00 pm | | at Colorado State; California Bears Classic | L 65–76 | 0–5 | Moby Arena (3,093); Fort Collins, CO |
| 11/27/2016*; 5:00 pm | | at Louisiana Tech; California Bears Classic | L 53–74 | 0–6 | Thomas Assembly Center (2,027); Ruston, LA |
| 11/30/2016*; 8:00 pm | | at Southeastern Louisiana; California Bears Classic | L 75–85 | 0–7 | University Center (866); Hammond, LA |
| 12/05/2016*; 7:00 pm | | Central Penn; California Bears Classic | W 87–74 | 1–7 | Hytche Athletic Center (1,488); Princess Anne, MD |
| 12/07/2016*; 8:30 pm, ACCN Extra | | at Virginia Tech | L 59–75 | 1–8 | Cassell Coliseum (7,068); Blacksburg, VA |
| 12/10/2016*; 5:00 pm, ESPN3 | | at UCF | L 58–76 | 1–9 | CFE Arena (3,579); Orlando, FL |
| 12/17/2016*; 3:00 pm, BTN | | at Michigan | L 49–98 | 1–10 | Crisler Center (12,020); Ann Arbor, MI |
| 12/19/2016*; 12:00 pm | | at American | L 58–61 | 1–11 | Bender Arena (418); Washington, D.C. |
| 12/21/2016*; 9:00 pm | | at UTEP; Sun Bowl Invitational semifinals | W 71–66 | 2–11 | Don Haskins Center (5,333); El Paso, TX |
| 12/22/2016*; 9:00 pm | | vs. Akron; Sun Bowl Invitational finals | L 60–76 | 2–12 | Don Haskins Center (4,633); El Paso, TX |
| 01/02/2017*; 6:00 pm | | Valley Forge | W 90–65 | 3–12 | Hytche Athletic Center (721); Princess Anne, MD |
MEAC regular season
| 01/09/2017; 7:30 pm | | at North Carolina A&T | W 99–88 | 4–12 (1–0) | Corbett Sports Center (1,418); Greensboro, NC |
| 01/11/2017; 6:00 pm | | at North Carolina Central | L 52–69 | 4–13 (1–1) | McLendon–McDougald Gymnasium (1,052); Durham, NC |
| 01/14/2017; 4:00 pm | | Howard | L 66–74 | 4–14 (1–2) | Hytche Athletic Center (842); Princess Anne, MD |
| 01/21/2017; 4:00 pm | | at Bethune–Cookman | W 82–79 | 5–14 (2–2) | Moore Gymnasium (802); Daytona Beach, FL |
| 01/23/2017; 7:30 pm | | at Florida A&M | W 86–79 | 6–14 (3–2) | Teaching Gym (1,479); Tallahassee, FL |
| 01/28/2017; 4:00 pm | | South Carolina State | W 92–69 | 7–14 (4–2) | Hytche Athletic Center (1,461); Princess Anne, MD |
| 01/30/2017; 7:30 pm | | Savannah State | L 82–87 | 7–15 (4–3) | Hytche Athletic Center (1,783); Princess Anne, MD |
| 02/01/2017; 7:30 pm | | at Hampton | L 65–66 | 7–16 (4–4) | Hampton Convocation Center (2,651); Hampton, VA |
| 02/04/2017; 7:30 pm | | Coppin State | W 78–57 | 8–16 (5–4) | Hytche Athletic Center (2,029); Princess Anne, MD |
| 02/11/2017; 4:00 pm | | at Norfolk State | L 69–75 | 8–17 (5–5) | Joseph G. Echols Memorial Hall (2,407); Norfolk, VA |
| 02/13/2017; 7:30 pm | | Bethune–Cookman | W 82–81 ^{OT} | 9–17 (6–5) | Hytche Athletic Center (2,067); Princess Anne, MD |
| 02/18/2017; 4:00 pm | | North Carolina Central | L 69–82 | 9–18 (6–6) | Hytche Athletic Center (4,837); Princess Anne, MD |
| 02/20/2017; 7:30 pm | | North Carolina A&T | W 106–95 ^{3OT} | 10–18 (7–6) | Hytche Athletic Center (1,782); Princess Anne, MD |
| 02/25/2017; 4:00 pm | | at Delaware State | W 65–64 | 11–18 (8–6) | Memorial Hall (1,928); Dover, DE |
| 02/27/2017; 7:30 pm | | at Howard | L 69–79 | 11–19 (8–7) | Burr Gymnasium (1,234); Washington, D.C. |
| 03/02/2017; 7:30 pm | | Morgan State | W 67–66 | 12–19 (9–7) | Hytche Athletic Center (2,110); Princess Anne, MD |
MEAC tournament
| 03/06/2017; 5:00 pm | (5) | vs. (12) North Carolina A&T; First round | W 75–65 | 13–19 | Norfolk Scope; Norfolk, VA |
| 03/09/2017; 8:00 pm | (5) | vs. (4) Hampton; Quarterfinals | W 68–66 | 14–19 | Norfolk Scope; Norfolk, VA |
| 03/10/2017; 6:00 pm | (5) | vs. (1) North Carolina Central; Semifinals | L 49–77 | 14–20 | Norfolk Scope; Norfolk, VA |
*Non-conference game. ^{#}Rankings from AP Poll. (#) Tournament seedings in parentheses. All times are in Eastern Time. Source
