= 2016–17 Howard Bison men's basketball team =

American college basketball season

2016–17 Howard Bison men's basketball
- Conference: Mid-Eastern Athletic Conference
- Record: 10–24 (5–11 MEAC)
- Head coach: Kevin Nickelberry (7th season)
- Assistant coaches: Keith Coutreyer; Travis Lyons; Sean Whalen
- Home arena: Burr Gymnasium

2016–17 MEAC men's basketball standings
	Conf.				Overall
Team	W		L	PCT	W		L	PCT
NC Central †	13	–	3	.813	25	–	9	.735
Norfolk State	12	–	4	.750	17	–	17	.500
Morgan State	11	–	5	.688	14	–	16	.467
Hampton	11	–	5	.688	14	–	17	.452
Savannah State*	10	–	6	.625	13	–	16	.448
MD Eastern Shore	9	–	7	.563	14	–	20	.412
South Carolina State	7	–	9	.438	11	–	20	.355
Delaware State	7	–	9	.438	10	–	22	.313
Coppin State	7	–	9	.438	8	–	24	.250
Bethune–Cookman	6	–	10	.375	10	–	22	.313
Howard	5	–	11	.313	10	–	24	.294
Florida A&M	5	–	11	.313	7	–	23	.233
North Carolina A&T	1	–	15	.063	3	–	29	.094
† 2017 MEAC tournament winner *ineligible for postseason due to APR violations

The 2016–17 Howard Bison men's basketball team represented Howard University during the 2016–17 NCAA Division I men's basketball season. The Bison, led by seventh-year head coach Kevin Nickelberry, played their home games at Burr Gymnasium in Washington, D.C. as members of the Mid-Eastern Athletic Conference. They finished the season 10–24, 5–11 in MEAC play to finish in a tie for 11th place. They defeated Coppin State and Morgan State in the MEAC tournament before losing in the semifinals to Norfolk State.

== Previous season ==
The Bison finished the 2015–16 season 12–20, 6–10 in MEAC play to finish in a tie for fifth place. They lost in the first round of the MEAC tournament to North Carolina Central.

== Preseason ==
The Bison were picked to finish in first place in the preseason MEAC poll. James Daniel III and Marcel Boyd were named to the preseason All-MEAC first team and Damon Collins was named to the third team. Daniel was also named the conference preseason player of the year.

== Roster ==
2016–17 Howard Bison men's basketball team
Players
Coaches

Pos.	#	Name	Height	Weight	Year	Hometown
G	00	Dalique Mingo	6 ft 2 in (1.88 m)	200 lb (91 kg)	Jr	Long Island, New York
G	1	Kai Tease	6 ft 0 in (1.83 m)	175 lb (79 kg)	Fr	Antelope, California
G	2	Kofi Andoh	6 ft 4 in (1.93 m)	195 lb (88 kg)	Sr	Largo, Maryland
G/F	3	Prince Okoroh	6 ft 5 in (1.96 m)	225 lb (102 kg)	RS Sr	Greenbelt, Maryland
G	4	Ausar Madison	5 ft 9 in (1.75 m)	150 lb (68 kg)	RS Jr	Los Angeles, California
F	5	Marcel Boyd	6 ft 10 in (2.08 m)	250 lb (113 kg)	Sr	Accokeek, Maryland
G	11	James Daniel III	6 ft 0 in (1.83 m)	175 lb (79 kg)	Sr	Hampton, Virginia
F	12	Solomon Mangham	6 ft 7 in (2.01 m)	230 lb (104 kg)	Sr	Stone Mountain, Georgia
G/F	13	Charles Williams	6 ft 4 in (1.93 m)	170 lb (77 kg)	Fr	Richmond, Virginia
G/F	15	Damon Collins	6 ft 6 in (1.98 m)	190 lb (86 kg)	Sr	Grand Prairie, Texas
G	21	Nate Garvey	6 ft 4 in (1.93 m)	170 lb (77 kg)	Fr	Montvale, New Jersey
F	22	Ibrahim Dosunmu	6 ft 7 in (2.01 m)	200 lb (91 kg)	Fr	Chicago, Illinois
F	23	Jalen Jones	6 ft 3 in (1.91 m)	200 lb (91 kg)	RS So	Kinston, North Carolina
G	24	Chuck Smith	5 ft 10 in (1.78 m)	180 lb (82 kg)	Sr	Denver, Colorado
F/C	25	Cameron Lewis	6 ft 8 in (2.03 m)	220 lb (100 kg)	So	Buffalo, New York
F	32	Tyler Stone	6 ft 7 in (2.01 m)	205 lb (93 kg)	Sr	Toronto, Canada
G	33	James Miller	6 ft 4 in (1.93 m)	185 lb (84 kg)	RS Jr	Clinton, North Carolina
F/C	34	Michael Obindu	6 ft 8 in (2.03 m)	230 lb (104 kg)	So	Ibusa Delta State, Nigeria
F/C	44	Henry Odunze	6 ft 9 in (2.06 m)	215 lb (98 kg)	Fr	Erwin, North Carolina

Head coach

- Kevin Nickelberry (Virginia Wesleyan)

Assistant coach(es)

- Keith Coutreyer
- Travis Lyons
- Sean Whalen

Legend

- (C) Team captain
- (S) Suspended
- (I) Ineligible
- (W) Walk-on
- Injured
- Current redshirt

Roster

== Schedule and results ==
Date time, TV	Rank^{#}	Opponent^{#}	Result	Record	Site (attendance) city, state
Regular season
11/11/2016*; 9:00 pm, BTN+		at Michigan; 2K Sports Classic	L 58–76	0–1	Crisler Center (10,094); Ann Arbor, MI
11/14/2016*; 8:30 pm, FS1		at Marquette; 2K Sports Classic	L 49–81	0–2	BMO Harris Bradley Center (11,305); Milwaukee, WI
11/18/2016*; 2:00 pm, ESPN3		at IUPUI; 2K Sports Classic	L 59–67	0–3	Indiana Farmers Coliseum (843); Indianapolis, IN
11/19/2016*; 11:00 am		vs. Gardner–Webb; 2K Sports Classic	L 78–94	0–4	Indiana Farmers Coliseum (863); Indianapolis, IN
11/27/2016*; 1:30 pm, FS1		at Georgetown	L 72–85	0–5	Verizon Center (5,258); Washington, D.C.
12/03/2016*; 4:00 pm		American	W 71–54	1–5	Burr Gymnasium (500); Washington, D.C.
12/07/2016*; 9:00 pm, ESPNU		at Maryland	L 56–79	1–6	Xfinity Center (15,584); College Park, MD
12/10/2016*; 7:00 pm		at George Washington	L 62–79	1–7	Charles E. Smith Center (2,304); Washington, D.C.
12/14/2016*; 7:00 pm		Jacksonville State	L 59–72	1–8	Burr Gymnasium (100); Washington, D.C.
12/16/2016*; 6:00 pm		Shenandoah	W 77–66	2–8	Burr Gymnasium (250); Washington, D.C.
12/18/2016*; 7:00 pm		Central Penn	W 67–60	3–8	Burr Gymnasium (150); Washington, D.C.
12/22/2016*; 7:00 pm		at Old Dominion	L 46–65	3–9	Ted Constant Convocation Center (4,665); Norfolk, VA
12/27/2016*; 7:00 pm		at VCU	L 51–85	3–10	Stuart C. Siegel Center (7,637); Richmond, VA
12/30/2016*; 7:00 pm		at Harvard	L 46–67	3–11	Lavietes Pavilion (1,646); Cambridge, MA
01/04/2017; 7:00 pm		Florida A&M	L 66–78	3–12 (0–1)	Burr Gymnasium (534); Washington, D.C.
01/07/2017*; 5:00 pm		at Columbia	L 48–66	3–13	Levien Gymnasium (1,193); New York, NY
01/14/2017; 12:00 pm		at Maryland Eastern Shore	W 74–66	4–13 (1–1)	Hytche Athletic Center (842); Princess Anne, MD
01/16/2017; 7:00 pm		Coppin State	L 72–81	4–14 (1–2)	Burr Gymnasium (834); Washington, D.C.
01/21/2017; 4:00 pm		at North Carolina A&T	W 78–63	5–14 (2–2)	Corbett Sports Center (2,143); Greensboro, NC
01/23/2017; 7:30 pm		at North Carolina Central	L 39–74	5–15 (2–3)	McLendon–McDougald Gymnasium (1,661); Durham, NC
01/28/2017; 4:00 pm		Savannah State	L 70–73	5–16 (2–4)	Burr Gymnasium (1,975); Washington, D.C.
01/30/2017; 7:00 pm		South Carolina State	L 68–77	5–17 (2–5)	Burr Gymnasium (2,703); Washington, D.C.
02/04/2017; 4:00 pm		at Florida A&M	L 62–71	5–18 (2–6)	Alfred Lawson, Jr. Multipurpose Center (2,179); Tallahassee, FL
02/06/2017; 8:00 pm		at Bethune–Cookman	L 67–71	5–19 (2–7)	Moore Gymnasium (981); Daytona Beach, FL
02/11/2017; 8:00 pm		at Hampton	L 61–75	5–20 (2–8)	Hampton Convocation Center (6,123); Hampton, VA
02/13/2017; 7:00 pm		Morgan State	W 70–67	6–20 (3–8)	Burr Gymnasium (934); Washington, D.C.
02/18/2017; 6:00 pm		North Carolina A&T	W 84–53	7–20 (4–8)	Burr Gymnasium (876); Washington, D.C.
02/20/2017; 7:00 pm		North Carolina Central	L 59–66	7–21 (4–9)	Burr Gymnasium (876); Washington, D.C.
02/25/2017; 8:00 pm		at Norfolk State	L 65–73	7–22 (4–10)	Joseph G. Echols Memorial Hall (2,832); Norfolk, VA
02/27/2017; 8:00 pm		Maryland Eastern Shore	W 79–69	8–22 (5–10)	Burr Gymnasium (1,234); Washington, D.C.
03/02/2017; 8:00 pm		at Delaware State	L 56–66	8–23 (5–11)	Memorial Hall (1,348); Dover, DE
MEAC tournament
03/06/2017; 7:00 pm	(11)	vs. (6) Coppin State; First round	W 79–73	9–23	Norfolk Scope; Norfolk, VA
03/09/2017; 6:00 pm	(11)	vs. (3) Morgan State; Quarterfinals	W 68–65	10–23	Norfolk Scope; Norfolk, VA
03/10/2017; 8:00 pm	(11)	vs. (2) Norfolk State; Semifinals	L 53–68	10–24	Norfolk Scope; Norfolk, VA
*Non-conference game. ^{#}Rankings from AP Poll. (#) Tournament seedings in parentheses. All times are in Eastern Time. Source
