= 2017 MEAC men's basketball tournament =

- Classification: Division I
- Season: 2016–17
- Teams: 12
- Site: Norfolk Scope; Norfolk, Virginia
- Champions: North Carolina Central (2nd title)
- Winning coach: LeVelle Moton (2nd title)
- MVP: Patrick Cole (North Carolina Central)
- Television: ESPN2

2016–17 MEAC men's basketball standings
| | Conf. | | | | Overall |
| Team | W | | L | PCT | W | | L | PCT |
|---|---|---|---|---|---|---|---|---|
| NC Central † | 13 | – | 3 | .813 | 25 | – | 9 | .735 |
| Norfolk State | 12 | – | 4 | .750 | 17 | – | 17 | .500 |
| Morgan State | 11 | – | 5 | .688 | 14 | – | 16 | .467 |
| Hampton | 11 | – | 5 | .688 | 14 | – | 17 | .452 |
| Savannah State* | 10 | – | 6 | .625 | 13 | – | 16 | .448 |
| MD Eastern Shore | 9 | – | 7 | .563 | 14 | – | 20 | .412 |
| South Carolina State | 7 | – | 9 | .438 | 11 | – | 20 | .355 |
| Delaware State | 7 | – | 9 | .438 | 10 | – | 22 | .313 |
| Coppin State | 7 | – | 9 | .438 | 8 | – | 24 | .250 |
| Bethune–Cookman | 6 | – | 10 | .375 | 10 | – | 22 | .313 |
| Howard | 5 | – | 11 | .313 | 10 | – | 24 | .294 |
| Florida A&M | 5 | – | 11 | .313 | 7 | – | 23 | .233 |
| North Carolina A&T | 1 | – | 15 | .063 | 3 | – | 29 | .094 |
*ineligible for postseason due to APR violations
† 2017 MEAC tournament winner

The 2017 Mid-Eastern Athletic Conference men's basketball tournament took place March 6–11, 2017 at the Norfolk Scope in Norfolk, Virginia. The champion, North Carolina Central, received the conference's automatic bid to the 2017 NCAA tournament with a 67–59 win over Norfolk State in the championship game.

== Seeds ==
The top 12 teams were eligible for the tournament, Savannah State was ineligible for postseason play due to APR Sanctions.

Teams were seeded by record within the conference, with a tiebreaker system to seed teams with identical conference records.

| Seed | School | Conference | Tiebreaker |
|---|---|---|---|
| 1 | North Carolina Central | 13–3 | |
| 2 | Norfolk State | 12–4 | |
| 3 | Morgan State | 11–5 | 1–0 vs Hampton |
| 4 | Hampton | 11–5 | 0–1 vs Morgan State |
| 5 | Md. Eastern Shore | 9–7 | |
| 6 | Coppin State | 7–9 | 0–1 vs Norfolk State |
| 7 | South Carolina State | 7–9 | 0–2 vs Norfolk State |
| 8 | Delaware State | 7–9 | 0–2 vs South Carolina State/Coppin State |
| 9 | Bethune–Cookman | 6–10 | |
| 10 | Florida A&M | 5–11 | 2–0 vs Howard |
| 11 | Howard | 5–11 | 0–2 vs Florida A&M |
| 12 | North Carolina A&T | 1–15 | |
† – MEAC regular season champions. Overall records are as of the end of the regular season.

== Schedule ==
| Session | Game | Time* | Matchup^{#} | Score | Television |
First round – Monday, March 6
| 1 | 1 | 5:00 pm | #5 Md. Eastern Shore vs. #12 North Carolina A&T | 75–65 | |
| 1 | 2 | 7:00 pm | #6 Coppin State vs. #11 Howard | 73–79 | |
First round – Tuesday, March 7
| 2 | 3 | 4:00 pm | #8 Delaware State vs. #9 Bethune–Cookman | 62–69 | |
| 2 | 4 | 6:00 pm | #7 South Carolina State vs. #10 Florida A&M | 82–78 | |
Quarterfinals – Wednesday, March 8
| 3 | 5 | 6:00 pm | #9 Bethune–Cookman vs. #1 North Carolina Central | 60–95 | |
| 3 | 6 | 8:00 pm | #7 South Carolina State vs. #2 Norfolk State | 88–93^{OT} | |
Quarterfinals – Thursday, March 9
| 4 | 7 | 6:00 pm | #11 Howard vs. #3 Morgan State | 68–65 | |
| 4 | 8 | 8:00 pm | #5 Md. Eastern Shore vs. #4 Hampton | 68–66 | |
Semifinals – Friday, March 10
| 5 | 9 | 6:00 pm | #1 North Carolina Central vs. #5 Md. Eastern Shore | 77–49 | |
| 5 | 10 | 8:00 pm | #2 Norfolk State vs. #11 Howard | 68–53 | |
Championship – Saturday, March 11
| 6 | 11 | 1:00pm | #1 North Carolina Central vs. #2 Norfolk State | 67–59 | ESPN2 |
*Game times in EST. #-Rankings denote tournament seeding.

== Bracket ==
First round March 6/7
8 | Delaware State | 62
9 | Bethune–Cookman | 69
5 | Maryland Eastern Shore | 75
12 | North Carolina A&T | 65
7 | South Carolina State | 82*
10 | Florida A&M | 78
6 | Coppin State | 73
11 | Howard | 79

Quarterfinals; March 8/9
1 | North Carolina Central | 95
9 | Bethune–Cookman | 60
4 | Hampton | 66
5 | Maryland Eastern Shore | 68
2 | Norfolk State | 93*
7 | South Carolina State | 88
3 | Morgan State | 65
11 | Howard | 68

Semifinals; March 10
1 | North Carolina Central | 77
5 | Maryland Eastern Shore | 49
2 | Norfolk State | 68
11 | Howard | 53

Championship; March 11
1 | North Carolina Central | 67
2 | Norfolk State | 59

* denotes overtime period
