= 2016–17 North Carolina A&T Aggies men's basketball team =

American college basketball season

2016–17 North Carolina A&T Aggies men's basketball
- Conference: Mid-Eastern Athletic Conference
- Record: 3–29 (1–15 MEAC)
- Head coach: Jay Joyner (1st season)
- Assistant coaches: Willie Jones; Ray Martin; Marque Carrington
- Home arena: Corbett Sports Center

2016–17 MEAC men's basketball standings
	Conf.				Overall
Team	W		L	PCT	W		L	PCT
NC Central †	13	–	3	.813	25	–	9	.735
Norfolk State	12	–	4	.750	17	–	17	.500
Morgan State	11	–	5	.688	14	–	16	.467
Hampton	11	–	5	.688	14	–	17	.452
Savannah State*	10	–	6	.625	13	–	16	.448
MD Eastern Shore	9	–	7	.563	14	–	20	.412
South Carolina State	7	–	9	.438	11	–	20	.355
Delaware State	7	–	9	.438	10	–	22	.313
Coppin State	7	–	9	.438	8	–	24	.250
Bethune–Cookman	6	–	10	.375	10	–	22	.313
Howard	5	–	11	.313	10	–	24	.294
Florida A&M	5	–	11	.313	7	–	23	.233
North Carolina A&T	1	–	15	.063	3	–	29	.094
† 2017 MEAC tournament winner *ineligible for postseason due to APR violations

The 2016–17 North Carolina A&T Aggies men's basketball team represented North Carolina Agricultural and Technical State University during the 2016–17 NCAA Division I men's basketball season. The Aggies, led by Jay Joyner in his first full year as head coach, played their home games at the Corbett Sports Center in Greensboro, North Carolina as members of the Mid-Eastern Athletic Conference. They finished the season 3–29, 1–15 in MEAC play to finish in last place. They lost in the first round of the MEAC tournament to Maryland Eastern Shore.

== Previous season ==
The Aggies finished the 2015–16 season 10–22, 7–9 in MEAC play to finish in a three-way tie for sixth place. They lost to Coppin State in the first round of the MEAC tournament.

Head coach Cy Alexander resigned on January 26, 2016. Assistant coach Jay Joyner took over on interim basis. On March 7, the interim tag was removed and Joyner was named head coach.

== Preseason ==
The Aggies were picked to finish seventh in the MEAC preseason poll. Sam Hunt was selected to the All-MEAC preseason first team.

== Roster ==
2016–17 North Carolina A&T Aggies men's basketball team
Players
Coaches

Pos.	#	Name	Height	Weight	Year	Previous school	Hometown
F	0	Davaris McGowens	6 ft 7 in (2.01 m)	230 lb (104 kg)	Jr	Gulf Coast State	Taylors, South Carolina
G	1	Aaren Edmead	5 ft 10 in (1.78 m)	165 lb (75 kg)	Jr	Deer Park HS	Deer Park, New York
G	2	Sam Hunt	6 ft 2 in (1.88 m)	175 lb (79 kg)	RS Jr	Jacksonville	Greensboro, North Carolina
F	4	Nick Reese	6 ft 7 in (2.01 m)	210 lb (95 kg)	RS Sr	Westchester Enriched Sciences Magnets	Los Angeles, California
G	5	Joshua Mullins	6 ft 3 in (1.91 m)	180 lb (82 kg)	Fr	Nash Central HS	Nashville, North Carolina
G	10	James Whitaker	6 ft 5 in (1.96 m)	180 lb (82 kg)	RS Sr	I. C. Norcom HS	Portsmouth, Virginia
G	11	Dalen Dotson	5 ft 11 in (1.8 m)	170 lb (77 kg)	Fr	Providence HS	Matthews, North Carolina
G	12	Martin Jones II	6 ft 1 in (1.85 m)	171 lb (78 kg)	So	Winton Woods HS	Cincinnati, Ohio
G	13	Austin Williams	6 ft 1 in (1.85 m)	175 lb (79 kg)	Jr	Believe Prep Academy	Queens, New York
G	14	Raymon Pratt	6 ft 1 in (1.85 m)	165 lb (75 kg)	Fr	Ben L. Smith HS	Greensboro, North Carolina
F	15	Amari Hamilton	6 ft 1 in (1.85 m)	265 lb (120 kg)	RS So	Southern HS	Durham, North Carolina
F	21	Japhet Kadji	6 ft 7 in (2.01 m)	205 lb (93 kg)	RS So	Wagner	Douala, Cameroon
F	24	Donte Watson	6 ft 6 in (1.98 m)	185 lb (84 kg)	Jr	Copiah-Lincoln CC	New Orleans, Louisiana
F	25	Femi Olujobi	6 ft 8 in (2.03 m)	233 lb (106 kg)	RS So	Oakland	Long Island, New York
G	30	Eliel Gonzalez	6 ft 2 in (1.88 m)	170 lb (77 kg)	Jr	Florida Preparatory Academy	Melbourne, Florida
F	32	Aaron Scales	6 ft 9 in (2.06 m)	233 lb (106 kg)	Sr	Cleveland State	High Point, North Carolina
F/C	35	Mike Owona	6 ft 9 in (2.06 m)	250 lb (113 kg)	Sr	Northwest Kansas Tech	Bel Air, Maryland

Head coach

- Jay Joyner (South Carolina State)

Assistant coach(es)

- Willie Jones (South Carolina State)
- Ray Martin (Notre Dame)
- Marque Carrington (North Carolina A&T)

Legend

- (C) Team captain
- (S) Suspended
- (I) Ineligible
- (W) Walk-on
- Injured
- Current redshirt

Roster
Last update: November 24, 2016

== Schedule and results ==
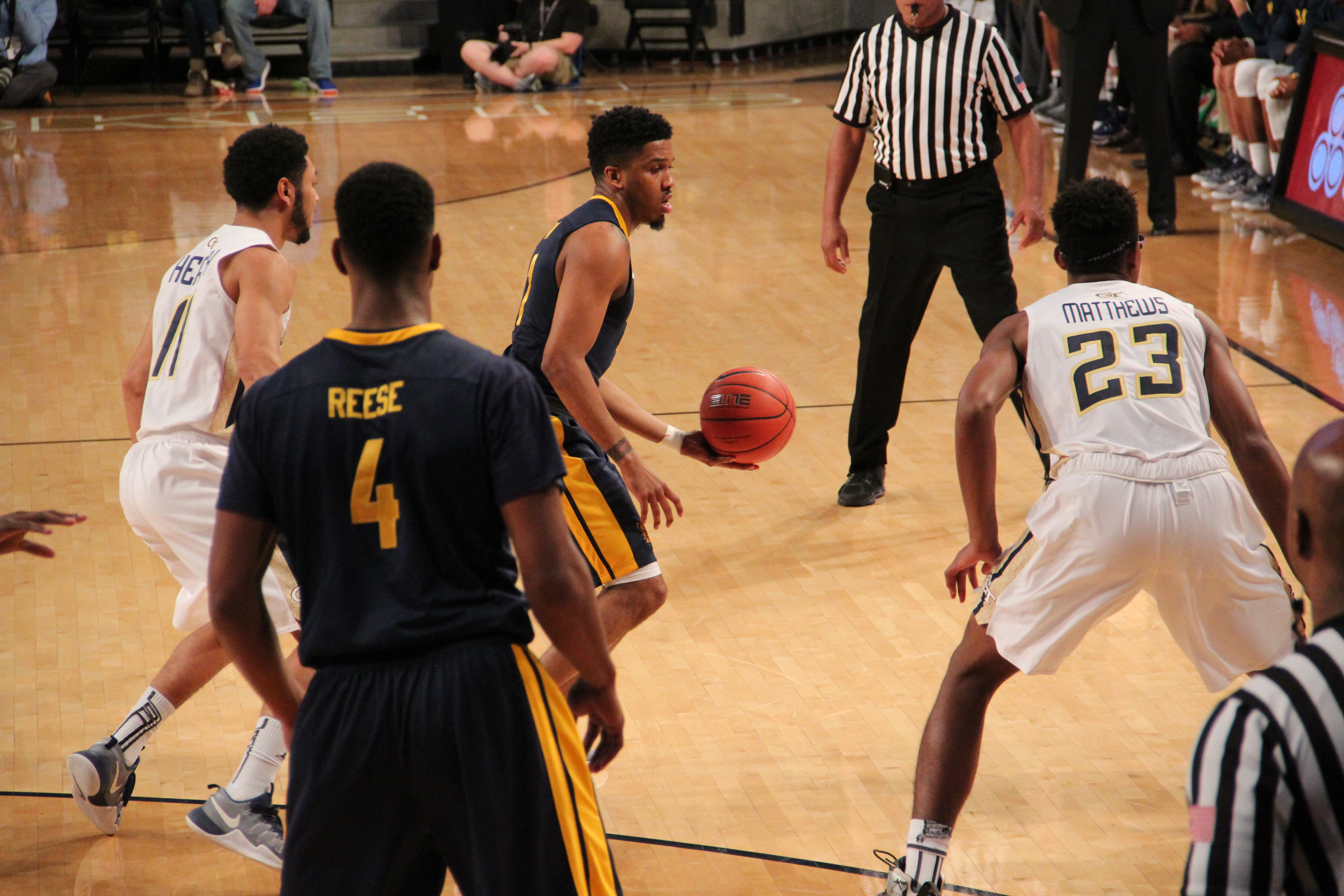
North Carolina A&T playing against Georgia Tech

Date time, TV	Rank^{#}	Opponent^{#}	Result	Record	Site (attendance) city, state
Regular season
11/11/2016*; 5:30 pm		Greensboro College	W 67–50	1–0	Corbett Sports Center (917); Greensboro, NC
11/14/2016*; 7:00 pm, ESPN3		at East Carolina	L 51–61	1–1	Williams Arena at Minges Coliseum (4,177); Greenville, NC
11/17/2016*; 7:00 pm		at Grambling State	L 55–59	1–2	Fredrick C. Hobdy Assembly Center (1,023); Grambling, LA
11/22/2016*; 8:00 pm		at WKU	L 56–77	1–3	E. A. Diddle Arena (3,751); Bowling Green, KY
11/26/2016*; 4:00 pm		Jacksonville	L 49–66	1–4	Corbett Sports Center (481); Greensboro, NC
11/29/2016*; 7:00 pm, ESPN3		at UNC Greensboro; Battle of Market Street	L 66–86	1–5	Greensboro Coliseum (3,146); Greensboro, NC
12/02/2016*; 7:00 pm		North Dakota	L 67–85	1–6	Corbett Sports Center (747); Greensboro, NC
12/04/2016*; 5:00 pm, ACCN Extra		at No. 23 Notre Dame	L 53–107	1–7	Edmund P. Joyce Center (7,801); South Bend, IN
12/13/2016*; 7:00 pm		at Massachusetts; Gotham Classic	L 59–65	1–8	Mullins Center (3,239); Amherst, MA
12/15/2016*; 10:00 pm		at Pacific; Gotham Classic	L 57–66	1–9	Alex G. Spanos Center (1,347); Stockton, CA
12/18/2016*; 1:00 pm		Rider	L 59–60	1–10	Corbett Sports Center (342); Greensboro, NC
12/22/2016*; 2:00 pm, ESPN3		at Kennesaw State; Gotham Classic	L 60–68	1–11	KSU Convocation Center (1,074); Kennesaw, GA
12/28/2016*; 7:30 pm, ACCN Extra		at Georgia Tech	L 52–59	1–12	Hank McCamish Pavilion (5,024); Atlanta, GA
01/04/2017; 7:00 pm		at Hampton	L 53–68	1–13 (0–1)	Hampton Convocation Center (2,103); Hampton, VA
01/07/2017; 4:00 pm		Delaware State	L 53–55	1–14 (0–2)	Corbett Sports Center (531); Greensboro, NC
01/09/2017; 7:30 pm		Maryland Eastern Shore	L 88–99	1–15 (0–3)	Corbett Sports Center (1,418); Greensboro, NC
01/14/2017; 4:00 pm		at Coppin State	L 73–75 ^{OT}	1–16 (0–4)	Physical Education Complex (533); Baltimore, MD
01/16/2017; 7:30 pm		at Morgan State	L 53–82	1–17 (0–5)	Talmadge L. Hill Field House (1,067); Baltimore, MD
01/21/2017; 4:00 pm		Howard	L 63–78	1–18 (0–6)	Corbett Sports Center (2,143); Greensboro, NC
01/28/2017; 4:00 pm		at North Carolina Central	L 59–82	1–19 (0–7)	McLendon–McDougald Gymnasium (3,210); Durham, NC
01/30/2017; 8:00 pm		at Norfolk State	L 69–83	1–20 (0–8)	Joseph G. Echols Memorial Hall (1,797); Norfolk, VA
02/01/2017; 7:30 pm		at Delaware State	L 65–82	1–21 (0–9)	Memorial Hall (857); Dover, DE
02/04/2017*; 7:00 pm		at Saint Louis	L 59–78	1–22	Chaifetz Arena (5,921); St. Louis, MO
02/07/2017*; 4:00 pm		Allen	W 86–78	2–22	Corbett Sports Center (1,056); Greensboro, NC
02/11/2017; 4:00 pm		Florida A&M	L 77–83	2–23 (0–10)	Corbett Sports Center (1,286); Greensboro, NC
02/13/2017; 7:30 pm		South Carolina State	L 65–72	2–24 (0–11)	Corbett Sports Center (1,006); Greensboro, NC
02/18/2017; 4:00 pm		at Howard	L 53–84	2–25 (0–12)	Burr Gymnasium (876); Washington, D.C.
02/20/2017; 7:30 pm		at Maryland Eastern Shore	L 95–106 ^{3OT}	2–26 (0–13)	Hytche Athletic Center (1,782); Princess Anne, MD
02/25/2017; 4:00 pm		Savannah State	L 91–110	2–27 (0–14)	Corbett Sports Center (1,002); Greensboro, NC
02/27/2017; 7:30 pm		Bethune–Cookman	L 70–73	2–28 (0–15)	Corbett Sports Center (1,037); Greensboro, NC
03/02/2017; 7:30 pm		North Carolina Central	W 68–63	3–28 (1–15)	Corbett Sports Center (5,700); Greensboro, NC
MEAC tournament
03/06/2017; 5:00 pm, ESPN3	(12)	vs. (5) Maryland Eastern Shore; First Round	L 65–75	3–29	Norfolk Scope; Norfolk, VA
*Non-conference game. ^{#}Rankings from AP Poll. (#) Tournament seedings in parentheses. All times are in Eastern Time Source.
