= Gravelle Craig =

Biographical details
- Born: June 10, 1970 (age 56)

Playing career
- 1991–1994: Cleveland State
- Position: Guard

Coaching career (HC unless noted)
- 2001–2003: Morris Brown College (asst.)
- 2003–2004: Chicago State (asst.)
- 2004–2011: Bethune-Cookman (asst./assoc. HC)
- 2011–2017: Bethune Cookman (Head Coach)
- 2018–2019: Stetson (assistant)
- 2019-2023: SPIRE Institute (Prep/Postgraduate Head Coach)

Head coaching record
- Overall: 74–123 (.376)

Gravelle Craig (born June 10, 1970) is a college basketball coach, currently serving as an assistant coach at Canisius University. From 2011 to 2017, Craig was the head coach for the Bethune-Cookman University men's basketball team. He is a former college basketball player (Richmond / Cleveland State).

== Head coaching career ==
The Bethune-Cookman Wildcats started slow winning only four out of their first fifteen games, a (4–11) start. Bethune-Cookman's strong showing (14-6) in the next twenty games gave Craig an 18–17 mark for his first season. They advanced to the MEAC Conference Championship game for the first and only time in school history. This would be the fourth consecutive winning season for the Wildcats. Craig resigned on March 20, 2017, after six seasons .

== Associate coach ==
Craig started serving as assistant coach 2004, serving as an associate head coach for six seasons before being named head coach in 2011. As associate head coach, his roles were to oversee the development of the Wildcats' backcourt players, recruit and scout future players and monitor the player's academics

On September 21, 2018, it was announced Craig would become an assistant at Stetson under head coach Corey Williams. Craig then would serve four seasons as head coach at Spire Academy a national prep school located in Geneva, Ohio from May 2019 - June 2023. Coach Craig is currently an assistant coach at Canisius University.

== Personal life ==
Craig is a graduate of Cleveland State University. He obtained his master's degree from Bethune Cookman University in 2016. He currently resides in Cleveland, Ohio.

== Head coaching record ==
Record table
Season	Team	Overall	Conference	Standing	Postseason
Bethune–Cookman Wildcats (MEAC) (2011–2017)
2011–12	Bethune–Cookman	18–17	11–5	4th	
2012–13	Bethune–Cookman	14–20	7–9	8th	
2013–14	Bethune–Cookman	7–25	5–11	8th	
2014–15	Bethune–Cookman	11–21	7–9	T–7th	
2015–16	Bethune–Cookman	14–18	10–6	4th	
2016–17	Bethune–Cookman	10–22	6–10	10th	
Bethune-Cookman:		74–123 (.376)	46–51 (.474)		
Total:		74–123 (.376)			
National champion Postseason invitational champion Conference regular season champion Conference regular season and conference tournament champion Division regular season champion Division regular season and conference tournament champion Conference tournament champion
