= Keith Walker (basketball) =

American basketball player and coach

Biographical details
- Born: December 28, 1958 (age 67)

Playing career
- 1978–1981: Clemson

Coaching career (HC unless noted)
- 1987–1993: Indiana (PA) (asst.)
- 1993–2000: Shaw
- 2000–2013: Delaware State (asst.)
- 2013–2018: Delaware State

Head coaching record
- Overall: 43–96 (.309)
- Tournaments: CBI: 0–1

Keith B. Walker (born December 28, 1958) is the former college men's basketball head coach for Delaware State University. He became interim head coach after previous coach Greg Jackson was fired January 30. Walker was named full head coach on April 15, 2014. He was fired from Delaware State on February 22, 2018.

== Div I head coaching record ==
Record table
| Season | Team | Overall | Conference | Standing | Postseason |
|---|---|---|---|---|---|
Delaware State Hornets (MEAC) (2013–2018)
| 2013–14 | Delaware State | 5–6 | 5–6 | T–8th | |
| 2014–15 | Delaware State | 18–18 | 9–7 | 5th | CBI First Round |
| 2015–16 | Delaware State | 7–25 | 5–11 | 12th | |
| 2016–17 | Delaware State | 10–22 | 7–9 | T–7th | |
| 2017–18 | Delaware State | 3–25 | 1–12 | | |
| Delaware State: | | 43–96 (.316) | 27–45 (.375) | | |
| Total: | | 43–96 (.309) | | | |
National champion Postseason invitational champion Conference regular season champion Conference regular season and conference tournament champion Division regular season champion Division regular season and conference tournament champion Conference tournament champion
