= 2016–17 North Carolina Central Eagles men's basketball team =

American college basketball season

2016–17 North Carolina Central Eagles men's basketball

MEAC regular-season and tournament champions

NCAA tournament, First Four
- Conference: Mid-Eastern Athletic Conference
- Record: 25–9 (13–3 MEAC)
- Head coach: LeVelle Moton (8th season)
- Assistant coaches: Luke D'Alessio; Reggie Sharp; Eric Wilson
- Home arena: McLendon–McDougald Gymnasium

2016–17 MEAC men's basketball standings
	Conf.				Overall
Team	W		L	PCT	W		L	PCT
NC Central †	13	–	3	.813	25	–	9	.735
Norfolk State	12	–	4	.750	17	–	17	.500
Morgan State	11	–	5	.688	14	–	16	.467
Hampton	11	–	5	.688	14	–	17	.452
Savannah State*	10	–	6	.625	13	–	16	.448
MD Eastern Shore	9	–	7	.563	14	–	20	.412
South Carolina State	7	–	9	.438	11	–	20	.355
Delaware State	7	–	9	.438	10	–	22	.313
Coppin State	7	–	9	.438	8	–	24	.250
Bethune–Cookman	6	–	10	.375	10	–	22	.313
Howard	5	–	11	.313	10	–	24	.294
Florida A&M	5	–	11	.313	7	–	23	.233
North Carolina A&T	1	–	15	.063	3	–	29	.094
† 2017 MEAC tournament winner *ineligible for postseason due to APR violations

The 2016–17 North Carolina Central Eagles men's basketball team represented North Carolina Central University during the 2016–17 NCAA Division I men's basketball season. The Eagles, led by eighth-year head coach LeVelle Moton, played their home games at McLendon–McDougald Gymnasium in Durham, North Carolina as members of the Mid-Eastern Athletic Conference (MEAC). They finished the season 25–9, 13–3 in MEAC play, to win the MEAC regular-season championship. In the MEAC tournament, they defeated Bethune–Cookman, Maryland Eastern Shore and Norfolk State to be champions of the conference tournament. As a result, they earned the MEAC's automatic bid to the NCAA tournament as a No. 16 seed. There they lost in the First Four to fellow No. 16 seed UC Davis.

== Previous season ==
The Eagles finished the 2015–16 season 13–19, 7–9 in MEAC play, to finish in a tie for fifth place. They beat Howard in the first round of the MEAC tournament, before falling to Norfolk State in the quarterfinals.

== Preseason ==
The Eagles were picked to finish in fourth place in the preseason MEAC poll. Patrick Cole was named to the preseason All-MEAC second team.

== Roster ==
2016–17 North Carolina Central Eagles men's basketball team
Players
Coaches

Pos.	#	Name	Height	Weight	Year	Hometown
G	0	Raekwon Harney	6 ft 0 in (1.83 m)	175 lb (79 kg)	RS Jr	Winston-Salem, NC
G	1	C.J. Wiggins	5 ft 11 in (1.8 m)	170 lb (77 kg)	So	Richmond, VA
G	3	Rashaun Madison	6 ft 0 in (1.83 m)	175 lb (79 kg)	RS Sr	Norfolk, VA
F	5	Del'Vin Dickerson	6 ft 5 in (1.96 m)	215 lb (98 kg)	RS Sr	Houston, TX
G	10	Dajuan Graf	6 ft 0 in (1.83 m)	185 lb (84 kg)	RS Sr	Charlotte, NC
G	11	Patrick Cole	6 ft 5 in (1.96 m)	210 lb (95 kg)	RS Sr	Newark, NJ
G	12	Alex Mills	6 ft 1 in (1.85 m)	185 lb (84 kg)	Jr	Laurens, SC
F	13	Pablo Rivas	6 ft 6 in (1.98 m)	210 lb (95 kg)	Jr	Phoenix, AZ
G	21	Marius McAllister	6 ft 4 in (1.93 m)	205 lb (93 kg)	RS Jr	Durham, NC
F	25	Kyle Benton	6 ft 7 in (2.01 m)	230 lb (104 kg)	Sr	Long Beach, CA
G	33	Ron Trapps	6 ft 4 in (1.93 m)	200 lb (91 kg)	Sr	Lancaster, SC
F	34	Michael Wolfe	6 ft 8 in (2.03 m)	195 lb (88 kg)	Jr	Germantown, MD
F	42	Will Ransom	6 ft 8 in (2.03 m)	230 lb (104 kg)	RS Sr	Fort Worth, TX
G	55	John Guerra	6 ft 2 in (1.88 m)	205 lb (93 kg)	So	Cary, NC

Head coach

- LeVelle Moton (North Carolina Central)

Assistant coach(es)

- Luke D'Alessio (Catholic University of America)
- Reggie Sharp (Auburn)
- Eric Wilson (Western Carolina)

Legend

- (C) Team captain
- (S) Suspended
- (I) Ineligible
- (W) Walk-on
- Injured
- Current redshirt

Roster
Last update: March 22, 2025

== Schedule ==
Date time, TV	Rank^{#}	Opponent^{#}	Result	Record	Site (attendance) city, state
Non-conference regular season
November 12, 2016*; 12:00 p.m.		at Marshall; Global Sports Invitational	L 69–81	0–1	Cam Henderson Center (5,375); Huntington, WV
November 14, 2016*; 9:00 p.m., ESPNU		at Ohio State; Global Sports Invitational	L 63–69	0–2	Value City Arena (9,787); Columbus, OH
November 16, 2016*; 7:30 p.m., ESPN3		at Western Carolina; Global Sports Invitational	W 67–59	1–2	Ramsey Center (1,495); Cullowhee, NC
November 18, 2016*; 8:00 p.m.		Jackson State; Global Sports Invitational	W 84–75	2–2	McLendon–McDougald Gymnasium (1,979); Durham, NC
November 26, 2016*; 7:00 p.m., ESPN3		at Northern Kentucky	W 82–74	3–2	BB&T Arena (2,141); Highland Heights, KY
November 28, 2016*; 7:00 p.m., SECN		at Missouri	W 62–52	4–2	Mizzou Arena (4,123); Columbia, MO
December 1, 2016*; 7:00 p.m.		Southern Wesleyan	W 92–55	5–2	McLendon–McDougald Gymnasium (1,278); Durham, NC
December 3, 2016*; 5:00 p.m., ESPN3		at East Carolina	L 56–69	5–3	Williams Arena at Minges Coliseum (4,638); Greenville, SC
December 6, 2016*; 7:00 p.m.		LIU Brooklyn	W 79–56	6–3	McLendon–McDougald Gymnasium (772); Durham, NC
December 10, 2016*; 2:00 p.m.		at Coastal Carolina	L 67–70	6–4	HTC Center (1,907); Conway, SC
December 13, 2016*; 9:00 p.m., SECN		at LSU	L 66–70	6–5	Pete Maravich Assembly Center (6,415); Baton Rouge, LA
December 17, 2016*; 4:00 p.m.		at McNeese State	W 74–66	7–5	Burton Coliseum (597); Lake Charles, LA
December 28, 2016*; 7:00 p.m.		Truett McConnell	W 88–54	8–5	McLendon–McDougald Gymnasium (674); Durham, NC
December 30, 2016*; 7:00 p.m.		Montreat	W 101–66	9–5	McLendon–McDougald Gymnasium (773); Durham, NC
MEAC regular season
January 10, 2017; 4:00 p.m.		Delaware State	L 68–69	9–6 (0–1)	McLendon–McDougald Gymnasium (859); Durham, NC
January 11, 2017; 6:00 p.m.		Maryland Eastern Shore	W 69–52	10–6 (1–1)	McLendon–McDougald Gymnasium (1,052); Durham, NC
January 14, 2017; 6:30 p.m.		at Norfolk State	W 72–57	11–6 (2–1)	Joseph G. Echols Memorial Hall (2,064); Norfolk, VA
January 16, 2017; 7:00 p.m., ESPNU		at Hampton	W 64–51	12–6 (3–1)	Hampton Convocation Center (4,545); Hampton, VA
January 23, 2017; 7:30 p.m.		Howard	W 74–39	13–6 (4–1)	McLendon–McDougald Gymnasium (1,661); Durham, NC
January 28, 2017; 4:00 p.m.		North Carolina A&T	W 82–59	14–6 (5–1)	McLendon–McDougald Gymnasium (3,210); Durham, NC
January 30, 2017; 7:30 p.m.		at Delaware State	W 82–74	15–6 (6–1)	Memorial Hall (943); Dover, DE
February 4, 2017; 7:30 p.m.		at Morgan State	W 68–62	16–6 (7–1)	Talmadge L. Hill Field House (1,103); Baltimore, MD
February 6, 2017; 7:30 p.m.		at Coppin State	W 86–77	17–6 (8–1)	Physical Education Complex (788); Baltimore, MD
February 11, 2017; 4:00 p.m.		South Carolina State	W 85–62	18–6 (9–1)	McLendon–McDougald Gymnasium (1,639); Durham, NC
February 13, 2017; 7:30 p.m.		Florida A&M	W 78–73	19–6 (10–1)	McLendon–McDougald Gymnasium (986); Durham, NC
February 18, 2017; 4:00 p.m.		at Maryland Eastern Shore	W 82–69	20–6 (11–1)	Hytche Athletic Center (4,837); Princess Anne, MD
February 20, 2017; 7:00 p.m.		at Howard	W 66–59	21–6 (12–1)	Burr Gymnasium (876); Washington, D.C.
February 25, 2017; 7:30 p.m.		Bethune–Cookman	W 78–63	22–6 (13–1)	McLendon–McDougald Gymnasium (1,662); Durham, NC
February 27, 2017; 7:30 p.m.		Savannah State	L 73–74	22–7 (13–2)	McLendon–McDougald Gymnasium (2,276); Durham, NC
March 2, 2017; 7:30 p.m.		at North Carolina A&T	L 63–68	22–8 (13–3)	Corbett Sports Center (5,700); Greensboro, NC
MEAC tournament
March 8, 2017; 6:00 p.m., ESPN3	(1)	vs. (9) Bethune–Cookman; Quarterfinals	W 95–60	23–8	Norfolk Scope (7,233); Norfolk, VA
March 10, 2017; 6:00 p.m., ESPN3	(1)	vs. (5) Maryland Eastern Shore; Semifinals	W 77–49	24–8	Norfolk Scope (13,331); Norfolk, VA
March 11, 2017; 1:00 p.m., ESPN2	(1)	vs. (2) Norfolk State; Championship	W 67–59	25–8	Norfolk Scope (7,111); Norfolk, VA
NCAA tournament
March 15, 2017*; 6:40 p.m., truTV	(16 MW)	vs. (16 MW) UC Davis; First Four	L 63–67	25–9	UD Arena (11,528); Dayton, OH
*Non-conference game. ^{#}Rankings from AP poll. (#) Tournament seedings in parentheses. MW=Midwest Region. All times are in Eastern.
