= SHM Memorial Center =

Arena in Orangeburg, South Carolina

Smith–Hammond–Middleton Memorial Center
- SHM Memorial Center
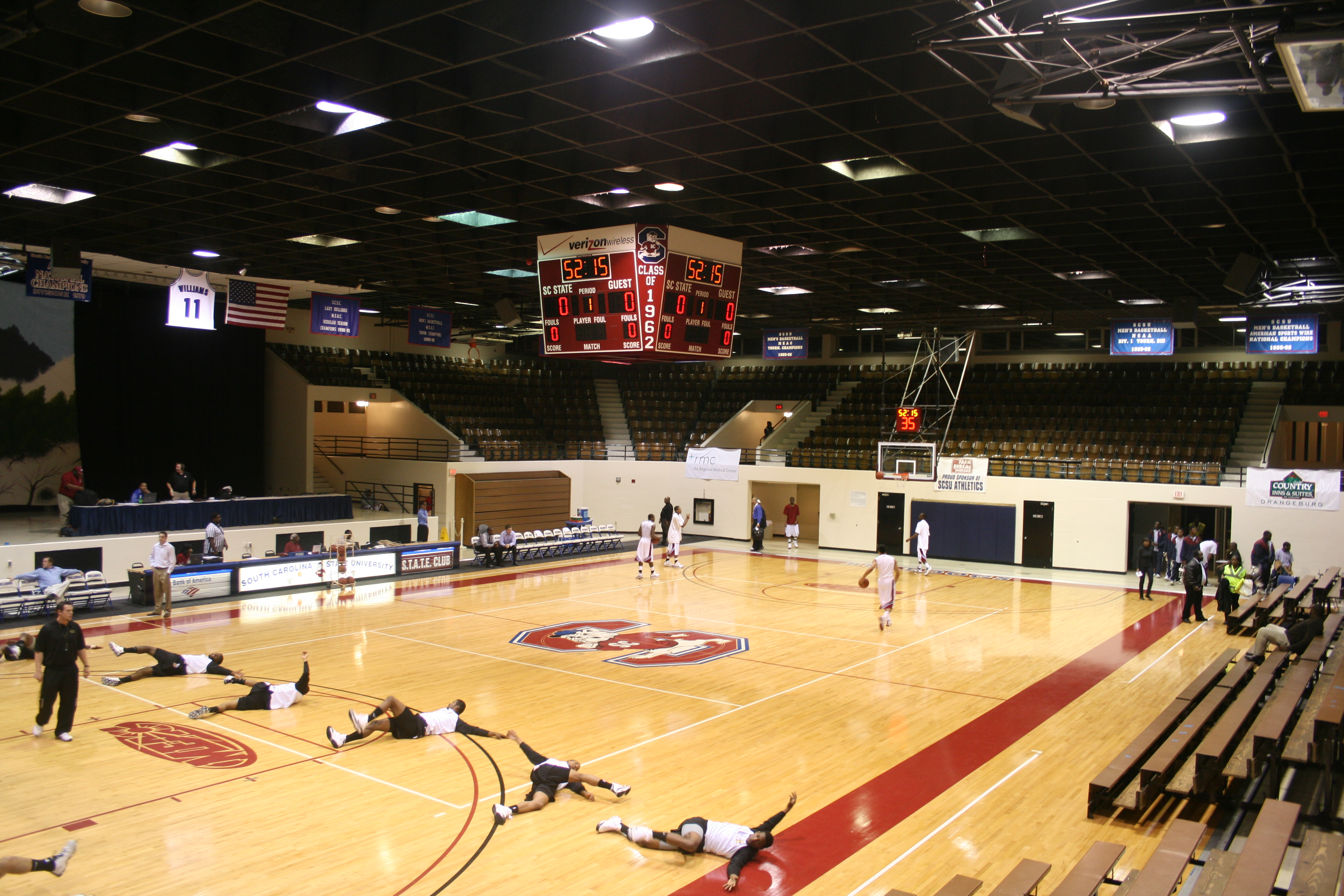
- Interactive map of Smith–Hammond–Middleton Memorial Center
- Location: 300 College Street; Orangeburg, South Carolina 29117
- Coordinates: 33.500979°N 80.846522°W
- Owner: South Carolina State University
- Operator: South Carolina State University
- Capacity: 3,200
- Surface: Hardwood

Construction
- Groundbreaking: 1966
- Opened: February 8, 1968
- Cost: $1.4 million ($13 million in 2025 dollars)

Tenants
- South Carolina State Bulldogs and Lady Bulldogs men's and women's basketball South Carolina State University women's volleyball

The Smith–Hammond–Middleton Memorial Center is a 3,200-seat multi-purpose arena in Orangeburg, South Carolina, named in memory of Samuel Hammond, Delano Middleton, and Henry Smith, who died in the Orangeburg Massacre, the same night the arena opened. It is home to the South Carolina State University Bulldogs basketball teams.

== See also ==
- List of NCAA Division I basketball arenas
