= 2017–18 Morgan State Bears basketball team =

American college basketball season

2017–18 Morgan State Bears men's basketball
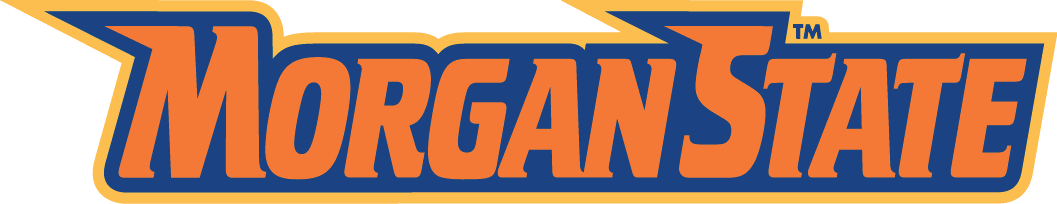
- Conference: Mid-Eastern Athletic Conference
- Record: 13–19 (7–9 MEAC)
- Head coach: Todd Bozeman (12th season)
- Assistant coaches: Brian Ellerbe; Larry Stewart; Hans Desir
- Home arena: Talmadge L. Hill Field House

2017–18 MEAC men's basketball standings
	Conf.				Overall
Team	W		L	PCT	W		L	PCT
Hampton	12	–	4	.750	19	–	16	.543
Bethune–Cookman	12	–	4	.750	18	–	14	.563
Savannah State	12	–	4	.750	15	–	17	.469
North Carolina A&T	11	–	5	.688	20	–	15	.571
Norfolk State	11	–	5	.688	14	–	19	.424
North Carolina Central †	9	–	7	.563	19	–	16	.543
Morgan State	7	–	9	.438	13	–	19	.406
Howard	7	–	9	.438	10	–	23	.303
Florida A&M	7	–	9	.438	9	–	25	.265
South Carolina State	6	–	10	.375	10	–	22	.313
Coppin State	5	–	11	.313	5	–	27	.156
Maryland Eastern Shore	3	–	13	.188	7	–	25	.219
Delaware State	2	–	14	.125	4	–	28	.125
† 2018 MEAC tournament winner

The 2017–18 Morgan State Bears men's basketball team represented Morgan State University during the 2017–18 NCAA Division I men's basketball season. The Bears, led by 12th-year head coach Todd Bozeman, played their home games at the Talmadge L. Hill Field House in Baltimore, Maryland as members of the Mid-Eastern Athletic Conference. They finished the season 13–19, 7–9 in MEAC play to finish in a three-way tie for seventh place. As the No. 7 seed in the MEAC tournament, they defeated South Carolina State and Bethune–Cookman before losing to North Carolina Central in the semifinals.

== Previous season ==
The Bears finished the 2016–17 season 14–16, 11–5 in MEAC play to finish in a tie for third place. They lost in the quarterfinals of the MEAC tournament to Howard.

== Preseason ==
The Bears were picked to win the MEAC, receiving 13 first place votes, in the preseason MEAC poll.

Phillip Carr and Tiwian Kendley were named to the Preseason All-MEAC First Team.

== Roster ==
2017–18 Morgan State Bears men's basketball team
Players
Coaches

Pos.	#	Name	Height	Weight	Year	Previous school	Hometown
G	0	Stanley Davis	6 ft 4 in (1.93 m)	175 lb (79 kg)	So	STEM Academy	Chester, Pennsylvania
G	1	LaPri McCray-Pace	6 ft 4 in (1.93 m)	210 lb (95 kg)	Fr	Conwell–Egan Catholic	Philadelphia, Pennsylvania
G	2	Martez Cameron	5 ft 11 in (1.8 m)	165 lb (75 kg)	Jr	Montverde Academy	Chicago, Illinois
F/C	3	Azariah Sykes	6 ft 8 in (2.03 m)	210 lb (95 kg)	So	Millwood (VA)	Richmond, Virginia
G	4	Kyson Rawls	6 ft 1 in (1.85 m)	190 lb (86 kg)	Fr	St. Georges Tech	New Castle, Delaware
G	5	Tiwian Kendley	6 ft 5 in (1.96 m)	190 lb (86 kg)	Sr	Eleanor Roosevelt; Lamar CC	Harlem, New York
G	10	Antonio Gillespie	6 ft 0 in (1.83 m)	170 lb (77 kg)	Jr	Central	Memphis, Tennessee
G	11	Jalen Robinson	6 ft 4 in (1.93 m)	170 lb (77 kg)	Fr	Bowie	Bowie, Maryland
F/C	12	Alex Ennis	6 ft 10 in (2.08 m)	225 lb (102 kg)	Jr	Neptune; Independence CC	Kingston, Jamaica
G	13	Tyler Streeter	6 ft 4 in (1.93 m)	190 lb (86 kg)	Jr	St. Francis de Sales	Chicago, Illinois
F	22	Phillip Carr	6 ft 9 in (2.06 m)	205 lb (93 kg)	Sr	Transit Tech; Williston State College	Brooklyn, New York
G	23	Khalil Gracey	6 ft 5 in (1.96 m)	180 lb (82 kg)	Jr	Bloomfield Hills	Bloomfield Hills, Michigan
F	32	David Syfax	6 ft 7 in (2.01 m)	205 lb (93 kg)	So	Pershing	Detroit, Michigan
F	34	Elijah Staley	6 ft 7 in (2.01 m)	245 lb (111 kg)	RS Jr	Wheeler	Marietta, Georgia
F/C	44	Tyjhai Byers	6 ft 10 in (2.08 m)	210 lb (95 kg)	So	Bethesda-Chevy Chase	Bethesda, Maryland

Head coach

- Todd Bozeman (Rhode Island)

Assistant coach(es)

- Brian Ellerbe (Rutgers)
- Larry Stewart (Coppin State)
- Hans Desir (St. Catharine)

Legend

- (C) Team captain
- (S) Suspended
- (I) Ineligible
- (W) Walk-on
- Injured
- Current redshirt

Roster
Last update: January 19, 2018

== Schedule and results ==
Date time, TV	Rank^{#}	Opponent^{#}	Result	Record	Site (attendance) city, state
Non-conference regular season
Nov 10, 2017*; 7:00 pm, ESPN3		at Binghamton	L 59–76	0–1	Binghamton University Events Center (2,748); Vestal, NY
Nov 13, 2017*; 7:00 pm, ESPN3		at South Florida	W 63–53	1–1	USF Sun Dome (2,116); Tampa, FL
Nov 16, 2017*; 7:00 pm		Lincoln (PA)	W 72–60	2–1	Talmadge L. Hill Field House (3,008); Baltimore, MD
Nov 18, 2017*; 7:30 pm, Nexstar		at No. 24 West Virginia	L 48–111	2–2	WVU Coliseum (11,698); Morgantown, WV
Nov 21, 2017*; 7:00 pm		Goldey–Beacom	W 82–67	3–2	Talmadge L. Hill Field House (603); Baltimore, MD
Nov 27, 2018*; 7:00 pm		at Mount St. Mary's	W 69–63	4–2	Knott Arena (1,420); Emmitsburg, MD
Nov 29, 2017*; 7:00 pm		at George Washington	L 66–73	4–3	Charles E. Smith Center (2,018); Washington, D.C.
Dec 3, 2017*; 1:05 pm		at Navy	L 59–66	4–4	Alumni Hall (848); Annapolis, MD
Dec 6, 2017*; 7:00 pm		at Towson; Battle for Greater Baltimore	L 78–82	4–5	SECU Arena (2,456); Towson, MD
Dec 9, 2017*; 7:00 pm		at Manhattan	L 66–80	4–6	Draddy Gymnasium (952); Riverdale, NY
Dec 22, 2017*; 7:00 pm		at George Mason	L 79–86	4–7	EagleBank Arena (2,582); Fairfax, VA
Dec 27, 2017*; 8:00 pm, ESPN3		vs. Grand Canyon; Las Vegas Showcase	L 74–100	4–8	Orleans Arena (1,544); Paradise, NV
Dec 30, 2017*; 10:00 pm		at Cal State Northridge	L 69–79	4–9	Matadome (479); Northridge, CA
MEAC regular season
Jan 3, 2018; 7:30 pm		Maryland Eastern Shore	W 85–82	5–9 (1–0)	Talmadge L. Hill Field House (1,256); Baltimore, MD
Jan 6, 2018; 4:00 pm		Florida A&M	W 87–68	6–9 (2–0)	Talmadge L. Hill Field House (1,021); Baltimore, MD
Jan 8, 2018; 7:30 pm		Savannah State	W 89–88	7–9 (3–0)	Talmadge L. Hill Field House (875); Baltimore, MD
Jan 13, 2018; 4:00 pm		at North Carolina A&T	L 67–69	7–10 (3–1)	Corbett Sports Center (2,614); Greensboro, NC
Jan 15, 2018; 4:00 pm		at North Carolina Central	L 63–77	7–11 (3–2)	McDougald–McLendon Gymnasium (1,377); Durham, NC
Jan 20, 2018; 4:00 pm		at Coppin State	L 73–80 ^{OT}	7–12 (3–3)	Physical Education Complex (2,100); Baltimore, MD
Jan 22, 2018; 7:30 pm		Delaware State	W 61–47	8–12 (4–3)	Talmadge L. Hill Field House (3,286); Baltimore, MD
Jan 29, 2018; 7:30 pm		South Carolina State	L 59–74	8–13 (4–4)	Talmadge L. Hill Field House (3,109); Baltimore, MD
Feb 3, 2018; 6:30 pm		at Norfolk State	L 65–76	8–14 (4–5)	Joseph G. Echols Memorial Hall (2,603); Norfolk, VA
Feb 5, 2018; 7:30 pm		Howard	W 97–61	9–14 (5–5)	Talmadge L. Hill Field House (3,156); Baltimore, MD
Feb 10, 2018; 6:00 pm		at Savannah State	L 94–97 ^{OT}	9–15 (5–6)	Tiger Arena (2,901); Savannah, GA
Feb 12, 2018; 8:00 pm		at Florida A&M	W 74–48	10–15 (6–6)	Teaching Gym; Tallahassee, FL
Feb 19, 2018; 7:30 pm		Bethune–Cookman	L 95–96 ^{OT}	10–16 (6–7)	Talmadge L. Hill Field House (2,376); Baltimore, MD
Feb 24, 2018; 6:00 pm		at Hampton game declared a forfeit when Morgan State left court following altercation in second half that led to ejections, including Morgan state head coach Todd Bozeman	L 0–2	10–17 (6–8)	Hampton Convocation Center (5,267); Hampton, VA
Feb 26, 2018; 8:00 pm		Coppin State	W 69–56	11–17 (7–8)	Talmadge L. Hill Field House (4,246); Baltimore, MD
Mar 1, 2018; 7:30 pm		at Delaware State	L 80–87	11–18 (7–9)	Memorial Hall (997); Dover, DE
MEAC tournament
Mar 6, 2018; 9:00 pm, ESPN3	(7)	vs. (10) South Carolina State; First round	W 83–80	12–18	Norfolk Scope; Norfolk, VA
Mar 7, 2018; 8:00 pm, ESPN3	(7)	vs. (2) Bethune–Cookman; Quarterfinals	W 78–77	13–18	Norfolk Scope; Norfolk, VA
Mar 9, 2018; 8:00 pm, ESPN3	(7)	vs. (6) North Carolina Central; Semifinals	L 70–79	13–19	Norfolk Scope; Norfolk, VA
*Non-conference game. ^{#}Rankings from AP Poll. (#) Tournament seedings in parentheses. All times are in Eastern Time.
