= 2017–18 Maryland Eastern Shore Hawks men's basketball team =

American college basketball season

2017–18 Maryland Eastern Shore Hawks men's basketball
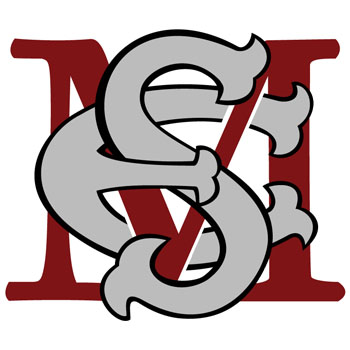
- Conference: Mid-Eastern Athletic Conference
- Record: 7–25 (3–13 MEAC)
- Head coach: Bobby Collins (4th season)
- Assistant coaches: Clifford Reed; Ace Custis; Ed Huckaby
- Home arena: Hytche Athletic Center

2017–18 MEAC men's basketball standings
	Conf.				Overall
Team	W		L	PCT	W		L	PCT
Hampton	12	–	4	.750	19	–	16	.543
Bethune–Cookman	12	–	4	.750	18	–	14	.563
Savannah State	12	–	4	.750	15	–	17	.469
North Carolina A&T	11	–	5	.688	20	–	15	.571
Norfolk State	11	–	5	.688	14	–	19	.424
North Carolina Central †	9	–	7	.563	19	–	16	.543
Morgan State	7	–	9	.438	13	–	19	.406
Howard	7	–	9	.438	10	–	23	.303
Florida A&M	7	–	9	.438	9	–	25	.265
South Carolina State	6	–	10	.375	10	–	22	.313
Coppin State	5	–	11	.313	5	–	27	.156
Maryland Eastern Shore	3	–	13	.188	7	–	25	.219
Delaware State	2	–	14	.125	4	–	28	.125
† 2018 MEAC tournament winner

The 2017–18 Maryland Eastern Shore Hawks men's basketball team represented the University of Maryland Eastern Shore during the 2017–18 NCAA Division I men's basketball season. The Hawks, led by fourth-year head coach Bobby Collins, played their home games at Hytche Athletic Center in Princess Anne, Maryland as members of the Mid-Eastern Athletic Conference. They finished the season 7-25, 3-13 in MEAC play to finish in 12th place. As the No. 12 seed in the MEAC tournament, they lost to Norfolk State in the first round.

On March 26, 2018, it was announced that head coach Bobby Collins' contract would not be renewed. He finished at UMES with a four-year record of 49–82. The school named assistant coach Clifford Reed interim head coach for the 2018–19 season.

== Previous season ==
The Hawks finished the 2016–17 season 14–20, 9–7 in MEAC play to finish in sixth place. They defeated North Carolina A&T and Bethune–Cookman in the MEAC tournament before losing in the semifinals to North Carolina Central.

== Awards ==
Preseason All-MEAC 2nd Team

- Ryan Andino

Emerald Coast Classic All–Tournament Team

- Ahmad Frost

== Roster ==
2017–18 Maryland Eastern Shore Hawks men's basketball team
Players
Coaches

Pos.	#	Name	Height	Weight	Year	Hometown
G	0	Ryan Andino	6 ft 2 in (1.88 m)	180 lb (82 kg)	Sr	Fort Lauderdale, Florida
F	1	Miryne Thomas	6 ft 8 in (2.03 m)	190 lb (86 kg)	Fr	Cleveland, Ohio
G	2	Cameron Bacote	6 ft 3 in (1.91 m)	170 lb (77 kg)	Fr	Hampton, Virginia
G	3	Logan McIntosh	6 ft 4 in (1.93 m)	180 lb (82 kg)	Sr	Atlanta, Georgia
G	4	Colen Gaynor	6 ft 5 in (1.96 m)	185 lb (84 kg)	RS Fr	Berlin, Maryland
F	5	LeAndre Thomas	6 ft 10 in (2.08 m)	245 lb (111 kg)	RS Fr	St. Petersburg, Florida
G	10	Montraz Oliver	6 ft 3 in (1.91 m)	160 lb (73 kg)	RS Fr	Princess Anne, Maryland
G	11	Ahmad Frost	6 ft 0 in (1.83 m)	185 lb (84 kg)	RS So	Cincinnati, Ohio
G	12	Najee Fitzgerald	6 ft 0 in (1.83 m)	210 lb (95 kg)	RS Sr	Baltimore, Maryland
G	13	Sean Hoggs	6 ft 0 in (1.83 m)	160 lb (73 kg)	Fr	Lawrenceville, New Jersey
F	15	Tyler Jones	6 ft 7 in (2.01 m)	200 lb (91 kg)	So	Atlantic City, New Jersey
G	20	Dontae Caldwell	6 ft 5 in (1.96 m)	190 lb (86 kg)	Jr	Santa Ana, California
F	21	Kevin Holmes	6 ft 10 in (2.08 m)	210 lb (95 kg)	Jr	Virginia Beach, Virginia
G	23	Michael Odiana	6 ft 2 in (1.88 m)	165 lb (75 kg)	Fr	Dracut, Massachusetts
F	35	Isaac Taylor	6 ft 8 in (2.03 m)	250 lb (113 kg)	Jr	Wachapreague, Virginia

Head coach

- Bobby Collins (Eastern Kentucky)

Assistant coach(es)

- Clifford Reed (Bethune–Cookman)
- Adrian Custis (Virginia Tech)
- Ed Huckaby (Toledo)

Legend

- (C) Team captain
- (S) Suspended
- (I) Ineligible
- (W) Walk-on
- Injured
- Current redshirt

Roster
Last update: January 11, 2018

== Schedule and results ==
Date time, TV	Rank^{#}	Opponent^{#}	Result	Record	Site (attendance) city, state
Exhibition
Nov 02, 2017*; 7:00 pm		Christopher Newport	W 61–58		Hytche Athletic Center; Princess Anne, MD
Non-conference regular season
Nov 10, 2017*; 8:00 pm		Valley Forge	W 95–69	1–0	Hytche Athletic Center (2,164); Princess Anne, MD
Nov 12, 2017*; 6:00 pm, BTN		at Maryland	L 43–96	1–1	Xfinity Center (13,914); College Park, MD
Nov 18, 2017*; 12:00 pm, FSN/MASN2		at Georgetown	L 57–83	1–2	Capital One Arena (6,381); Washington, D.C.
Nov 20, 2017*; 7:00 pm		at St. Bonaventure; Emerald Coast Classic	L 48–96	1–3	Reilly Center (3,281); Olean, NY
Nov 24, 2017*; 2:30 pm		vs. Jackson State; Emerald Coast Classic	W 66–63	2–3	The Arena at NWFSC (200); Niceville, FL
Nov 25, 2017*; 1:30 pm		vs. Tennessee Tech; Emerald Coast Classic	L 60–90	2–4	The Arena at NWFSC (125); Niceville, FL
Nov 27, 2017*; 7:00 pm		at Old Dominion	L 44–83	2–5	Ted Constant Convocation Center (5,166); Norfolk, VA
Dec 2, 2017*; 4:00 pm		American	W 74–70	3–5	Hytche Athletic Center (1,087); Princess Anne, MD
Dec 4, 2017*; 7:00 pm		at Duquesne	L 61–86	3–6	Palumbo Center (1,201); Pittsburgh, PA
Dec 8, 2017*; 7:00 pm, ESPN3		at Liberty	L 49–71	3–7	Vines Center (2,380); Lynchburg, VA
Dec 10, 2017*; 3:00 pm, ACCN Extra		at Virginia Tech	L 40–93	3–8	Cassell Coliseum (6,578); Blacksburg, VA
Dec 15, 2017*; 9:00 pm, FS1		at Creighton	L 36–87	3–9	CenturyLink Center (16,520); Omaha, NE
Dec 20, 2017*; 7:00 pm		at Iowa State	L 49–55	3–10	Hilton Coliseum (13,177); Ames, IA
Dec 22, 2017*; 8:00 pm, ESPN3		at Drake	L 57–81	3–11	Knapp Center (2,214); Des Moines, IA
Dec 31, 2017*; 3:00 pm		Central Penn	W 74–69	4–11	Hytche Athletic Center (517); Princess Anne, MD
MEAC regular season
Jan 3, 2018; 7:30 pm		at Morgan State	L 82–85	4–12 (0–1)	Talmadge L. Hill Field House (1,256); Baltimore, MD
Jan 6, 2018; 4:00 pm		Hampton	W 92–83	5–12 (1–1)	Hytche Athletic Center (924); Princess Anne, MD
Jan 8, 2018; 7:30 pm		Bethune–Cookman	L 84–89	5–13 (1–2)	Hytche Athletic Center (887); Princess Anne, MD
Jan 13, 2018; 6:00 pm		at Savannah State	L 59–87	5–14 (1–3)	Tiger Arena (2,136); Savannah, GA
Jan 15, 2018; 7:30 pm		at South Carolina State	L 62–66	5–15 (1–4)	SHM Memorial Center (298); Orangeburg, SC
Jan 20, 2018; 4:00 pm		North Carolina A&T	L 64–66	5–16 (1–5)	Hytche Athletic Center (1,036); Princess Anne, MD
Jan 22, 2018; 7:30 pm		North Carolina Central	L 60–63	5–17 (1–6)	Hytche Athletic Center (979); Princess Anne, MD
Jan 27, 2018; 4:00 pm		Howard	W 85–75	5–18 (1–7)	Hytche Athletic Center (1,622); Princess Anne, MD
Jan 29, 2018; 7:30 pm		at Coppin State	L 68–71	5–19 (1–8)	Physical Education Complex (989); Baltimore, MD
Feb 5, 2018; 7:30 pm		Florida A&M	W 62–61	6–19 (2–8)	Hytche Athletic Center (2,077); Princess Anne, MD
Feb 10, 2018; 4:00 pm		at Bethune–Cookman	L 67–87	6–20 (2–9)	Moore Gymnasium (902); Daytona Beach, FL
Feb 12, 2018; 7:30 pm		at Howard	L 56–84	6–21 (2–10)	Burr Gymnasium (1,536); Washington, D.C.
Feb 17, 2018; 4:00 pm		at North Carolina Central	L 56–84	6–22 (2–11)	McDougald–McLendon Gymnasium (1,536); Durham, NC
Feb 19, 2018; 7:30 pm		at North Carolina A&T	L 69–78	6–23 (2–12)	Corbett Sports Center (1,780); Greensboro, NC
Feb 24, 2018; 4:00 pm		Norfolk State	L 63–74	6–24 (2–13)	Hytche Athletic Center (4,671); Princess Anne, MD
Feb 26, 2018; 7:30 pm		Delaware State	W 59–47	7–24 (3–13)	Hytche Athletic Center (2,205); Princess Anne, MD
MEAC tournament
Mar 5, 2018; 9:00 pm, ESPN3	(12)	vs. (5) Norfolk State; First round	L 68–78	7–25	Norfolk Scope (4,021); Norfolk, VA
*Non-conference game. ^{#}Rankings from AP Poll. (#) Tournament seedings in parentheses. All times are in Eastern Time.
