= Kevin Nickelberry =

American basketball player and coach

Current position
- Title: Assistant coach
- Team: Florida State
- Conference: ACC

Biographical details
- Born: October 15, 1964 (age 62); Washington, D.C., U.S.
- Education: Virginia Wesleyan University (1984)

Playing career
- 1982–1984: Virginia Wesleyan

Coaching career (HC unless noted)
- 1991–1992: Columbia Union (assistant)
- 1991–1994: Columbia Union (women's)
- 1995–1998: Howard (assistant)
- 1998–1999: Monmouth (assistant)
- 1999–2001: Holy Cross (assistant)
- 2001–2003: Charlotte (assistant)
- 2003–2006: Clemson (assistant)
- 2006–2009: Hampton
- 2010–2019: Howard
- 2019–2022: LSU (assistant)
- 2022: LSU (interim HC)
- 2022–2023: Georgetown (assistant)
- 2023–present: Florida State (assistant)

International
- 2009–2010: Libya

Head coaching record
- Overall: Men's: 145–239 (.378); Women's: 43–32 (.573)
- Tournaments: 0–1 (NCAA); 0–1 (CBI)

Kevin Nickelberry (born October 15, 1964) is an American college basketball coach and current assistant coach at Florida State University. He previously served as the head men's basketball coach at Howard University and Hampton University.

== Personal life ==
Born in Washington, D.C., he is a member of Alpha Phi Alpha fraternity.

== Head coaching record ==
=== Men's ===
Record table
Season	Team	Overall	Conference	Standing	Postseason
Hampton (MEAC) (2006–2009)
2006–07	Hampton	15–16	10–8	3rd	
2007–08	Hampton	18–12	11–5	2nd	
2008–09	Hampton	16–16	8–8	7th	
Hampton:		49–44 (.527)	29–21 (.580)		
Howard (MEAC) (2010–2019)
2010–11	Howard	6–24	4–12	11th	
2011–12	Howard	10–21	6–10	8th	
2012–13	Howard	7–24	4–12	11th	
2013–14	Howard	8–25	5–11	8th	
2014–15	Howard	16–16	10–6	4th	
2015–16	Howard	12–20	6–10	T–9th	
2016–17	Howard	10–24	5–11	T-11th	
2017–18	Howard	10–23	7–9	T–7th	
2018–19	Howard	17–17	10–6	T–3rd	CBI First Round
Howard:		96–194 (.331)	57–87 (.396)		
LSU Tigers (Southeastern Conference) (2022)
2021–22	LSU	0–1	0–0		NCAA first round
LSU:		0–1 (.000)	0–0 (–)		
Total:		145–239 (.378)			
National champion Postseason invitational champion Conference regular season champion Conference regular season and conference tournament champion Division regular season champion Division regular season and conference tournament champion Conference tournament champion

=== Women's ===
Record table
Season	Team	Overall	Conference	Standing	Postseason
Columbia Union College () (1991–1994)
1991–92	Columbia Union	13–11			NAIA Playoffs
1992–93	Columbia Union	17–10			NAIA Playoffs
1993–94	Columbia Union	13–11			NAIA Playoffs
Columbia Union:		43–32 (.573)			
Total:		43–32 (.573)			
National champion Postseason invitational champion Conference regular season champion Conference regular season and conference tournament champion Division regular season champion Division regular season and conference tournament champion Conference tournament champion
