= 2017–18 Florida A&M Rattlers basketball team =

American college basketball season

2017–18 Florida A&M Rattlers basketball
- Conference: Mid-Eastern Athletic Conference
- Record: 9–25 (7–9 MEAC)
- Head coach: Robert McCullum (1st season)
- Assistant coaches: Carlos Briggs; Jarrett Stephens
- Home arena: Teaching Gym

2017–18 MEAC men's basketball standings
	Conf.				Overall
Team	W		L	PCT	W		L	PCT
Hampton	12	–	4	.750	19	–	16	.543
Bethune–Cookman	12	–	4	.750	18	–	14	.563
Savannah State	12	–	4	.750	15	–	17	.469
North Carolina A&T	11	–	5	.688	20	–	15	.571
Norfolk State	11	–	5	.688	14	–	19	.424
North Carolina Central †	9	–	7	.563	19	–	16	.543
Morgan State	7	–	9	.438	13	–	19	.406
Howard	7	–	9	.438	10	–	23	.303
Florida A&M	7	–	9	.438	9	–	25	.265
South Carolina State	6	–	10	.375	10	–	22	.313
Coppin State	5	–	11	.313	5	–	27	.156
Maryland Eastern Shore	3	–	13	.188	7	–	25	.219
Delaware State	2	–	14	.125	4	–	28	.125
† 2018 MEAC tournament winner

The 2017–18 Florida A&M Rattlers men's basketball team represented Florida A&M University during the 2017–18 NCAA Division I men's basketball season. The Rattlers, led by first-year head coach Robert McCullum, played their home games at the Teaching Gym in Tallahassee, Florida as members of the Mid-Eastern Athletic Conference. They finished the season 9–25, 7–9 in MEAC play to finish in a tie three-way tie for seventh place. As the No. 9 seed in the MEAC tournament, they defeated Howard before losing to Hampton in the quarterfinals,

== Previous season ==
The Rattlers finished the 2016–17 season 7–23, 5–11 in MEAC play to finish in a tie for 11th place. They lost in the first round of the MEAC tournament to South Carolina State.

On March 17, 2017, it was announced that head coach Byron Samuels' contract would not be renewed. He finished at Florida A&M with a three-year record of 17–71. On May 16, the school named Oregon assistant Robert McCullum as their new head coach. McCullum had previous head coaching jobs at Western Michigan and South Florida.

== Roster ==
2017–18 Florida A&M Rattlers men's basketball team
Players
Coaches

Pos.	#	Name	Height	Weight	Year	Hometown
F	0	Desmond Williams	6 ft 6 in (1.98 m)	205 lb (93 kg)	Sr	Atmore, Alabama
G	1	Nick Severado	6 ft 8 in (2.03 m)	185 lb (84 kg)	Jr	Savannah, Georgia
G	2	Kamron Reaves	6 ft 1 in (1.85 m)	172 lb (78 kg)	Fr	Champaign, Illinois
PG	3	Craig Bowman	6 ft 4 in (1.93 m)	180 lb (82 kg)	Sr	St. Petersburg, Florida
G	4	Elijah Mays	6 ft 0 in (1.83 m)	175 lb (79 kg)	RS Sr	Orlando, Florida
G	5	Nasir Core	6 ft 2 in (1.88 m)	205 lb (93 kg)	So	Tampa, Florida
F	10	John Clayton	6 ft 5 in (1.96 m)	215 lb (98 kg)	So	Lithonia, Georgia
F	11	Jovonni Harrell	6 ft 7 in (2.01 m)	205 lb (93 kg)	Jr	Chicago, Illinois
G	20	Brendon Myles	6 ft 4 in (1.93 m)	195 lb (88 kg)	So	Atlanta, Georgia
G	21	Justin Ravenel	6 ft 1 in (1.85 m)	175 lb (79 kg)	Jr	Lithonia, Georgia
G	22	Marcus Barham	6 ft 5 in (1.96 m)	185 lb (84 kg)	Sr	Melbourne, Florida
G	23	Bryce Moragne	6 ft 5 in (1.96 m)	195 lb (88 kg)	Fr	Tampa, Florida
C	24	Ifyeani Umezurike	6 ft 10 in (2.08 m)	245 lb (111 kg)	RS So	Lagos, Nigeria
F	30	Rashad Austin	6 ft 8 in (2.03 m)	220 lb (100 kg)	So	Tampa, Florida
F	33	D.J. Jones	6 ft 9 in (2.06 m)	195 lb (88 kg)	RS Fr	Brusly, Louisiana
C	34	Isaiah Martin	7 ft 0 in (2.13 m)	210 lb (95 kg)	RS Jr	Denver, Colorado

Head coach

- Robert McCullum (Birmingham–Southern)

Assistant coach(es)

- Carlos Briggs (Baylor)
- Jarrett Stephens (LeMoyne-Owen)

Legend

- (C) Team captain
- (S) Suspended
- (I) Ineligible
- (W) Walk-on
- Injured
- Current redshirt

Roster
Last update: January 11, 2018

== Schedule and results ==
Date time, TV	Rank^{#}	Opponent^{#}	Result	Record	Site (attendance) city, state
Exhibition
Nov 06, 2017*; 7:00 pm		Johnson (FL)	W 107–71		Teaching Gym; Tallahassee, FL
Non-conference regular season
Nov 10, 2017*; 7:00 pm, ESPN3/YurView		at Grand Canyon	L 51–67	0–1	GCU Arena (7,202); Phoenix, AZ
Nov 11, 2017*; 8:00 pm, Stadium		at UNLV	L 66–108	0–2	Thomas & Mack Center (9,457); Paradise, NV
Nov 16, 2017*; 7:00 pm, ACCN Extra		at No. 11 Miami (FL)	L 59–90	0–3	Watsco Center (6,735); Coral Gables, FL
Nov 18, 2017*; 4:00 pm		at Mississippi State; Hoops in the Heartland	L 48–79	0–4	Humphrey Coliseum (6,132); Starkville, MS
Nov 20, 2017*; 7:00 pm		Albany State	W 77–59	1–4	Teaching Gym (1,378); Tallahassee, FL
Nov 22, 2017*; 8:00 pm, MidcoSN/ESPN3		at North Dakota State; Hoops In The Heartland	L 66–80	1–5	Scheels Center (2,723); Fargo, ND
Nov 24, 2017*; 7:00 pm, ESPN3		at Green Bay; Hoops In The Heartland	L 50–57	1–6	Resch Center (2,239); Green Bay, WI
Nov 26, 2017*; 3:00 pm		at Stephen F. Austin; Hoops In The Heartland	L 51–67	1–7	William R. Johnson Coliseum (1,691); Nacogdoches, TX
Nov 29, 2017*; 7:00 pm, LHN		at Texas	L 58–82	1–8	Frank Erwin Center (8,511); Austin, TX
Dec 2, 2017*; 7:00 pm		at Murray State	L 59–80	1–9	CFSB Center (3,021); Murray, KY
Dec 9, 2017*; 4:00 pm, ESPN3		at Mercer	L 64–82	1–10	Hawkins Arena (3,527); Macon, GA
Dec 11, 2017*; 7:00 pm		North Florida	L 89–101	1–11	Teaching Gym (1,389); Tallahassee, FL
Dec 14, 2017*; 6:30 pm		at Southern	L 50–68	1–12	F. G. Clark Center (421); Baton Rouge, LA
Dec 17, 2017*; 4:00 pm, ESPNU		at Georgia Tech	L 51–67	1–13	McCamish Pavilion (5,156); Atlanta, GA
Dec 21, 2017*; 7:00 pm		at Fordham	L 69–79	1–14	Rose Hill Gymnasium (847); Bronx, NY
Dec 29, 2017*; 7:00 pm, ESPN3		at Ball State	L 54–75	1–15	Worthen Arena (2,902); Muncie, IN
MEAC regular season
Jan 3, 2018; 8:00 pm		Howard	W 84–76	2–15 (1–0)	Teaching Gym (1,492); Tallahassee, FL
Jan 6, 2018; 4:00 pm		at Morgan State	L 68–87	2–16 (1–1)	Talmadge L. Hill Field House (1,021); Baltimore, MD
Jan 8, 2018; 7:30 pm		at Coppin State	L 78–79 ^{2OT}	2–17 (1–2)	Physical Education Complex (327); Baltimore, MD
Jan 13, 2018; 4:00 pm		at Bethune–Cookman	L 81–99	2–18 (1–3)	Moore Gymnasium (904); Daytona Beach, FL
Jan 15, 2018; 8:00 pm		Delaware State	W 94–89 ^{OT}	3–18 (2–3)	Teaching Gym (2,487); Tallahassee, FL
Jan 27, 2018 yes		at Hampton	W 75–71	4–18 (3–3)	Hampton Convocation Center (5,234); Hampton, VA
Jan 29, 2018; 8:00 pm		at Norfolk State	L 71–80	4–19 (3–4)	Joseph G. Echols Memorial Hall (1,319); Norfolk, VA
Jan 31, 2018; 8:00 pm		Savannah State	L 100–107	4–20 (3–5)	Teaching Gym (2,479); Tallahassee, FL
Feb 3, 2018; 4:00 pm		at Howard	L 80–83 ^{OT}	4–21 (3–6)	Burr Gymnasium (2,152); Washington, D.C.
Feb 5, 2018; 7:30 pm		at Maryland Eastern Shore	L 61–62	4–22 (3–7)	Hytche Athletic Center (2,077); Princess Anne, MD
Feb 10, 2018; 6:00 pm		North Carolina Central	W 65–56	5–22 (4–7)	Teaching Gym (1,879); Tallahassee, FL
Feb 12, 2018; 8:00 pm		Morgan State	L 48–74	5–23 (4–8)	Teaching Gym; Tallahassee, FL
Feb 17, 2018; 4:00 pm		at Delaware State	L 63–66	6–23 (5–8)	Memorial Hall (854); Dover, DE
Feb 24, 2018; 6:00 pm		North Carolina A&T	W 83–77	7–23 (6–8)	Teaching Gym (1,458); Tallahassee, FL
Feb 26, 2018; 8:00 pm		South Carolina State	W 76–74	8–23 (7–8)	Teaching Gym (1,918); Tallahassee, FL
Mar 1, 2018; 8:00 pm		Bethune–Cookman	L 77–89	8–24 (7–9)	Teaching Gym (5,217); Tallahassee, FL
MEAC tournament
Mar 6, 2018; 4:00 pm	(9)	vs. (8) Howard; First round	W 88–78	9–24	Norfolk Scope; Norfolk, VA
Mar 7, 2018; 6:00 pm	(9)	vs. (1) Hampton; Quarterfinals	L 71–75	9–25	Norfolk Scope; Norfolk, VA
*Non-conference game. ^{#}Rankings from AP Poll. (#) Tournament seedings in parentheses. All times are in Eastern Time.
