= 2017–18 Bethune–Cookman Wildcats men's basketball team =

American college basketball season

2017–18 Bethune–Cookman Wildcats men's basketball

MEAC regular season co-champions
- Conference: Mid-Eastern Athletic Conference
- Record: 18–14 (12–4 MEAC)
- Head coach: Ryan Ridder (1st season)
- Assistant coaches: Dominique Taylor; Jeff Clapacs; Woody Taylor
- Home arena: Moore Gymnasium

2017–18 MEAC men's basketball standings
	Conf.				Overall
Team	W		L	PCT	W		L	PCT
Hampton	12	–	4	.750	19	–	16	.543
Bethune–Cookman	12	–	4	.750	18	–	14	.563
Savannah State	12	–	4	.750	15	–	17	.469
North Carolina A&T	11	–	5	.688	20	–	15	.571
Norfolk State	11	–	5	.688	14	–	19	.424
North Carolina Central †	9	–	7	.563	19	–	16	.543
Morgan State	7	–	9	.438	13	–	19	.406
Howard	7	–	9	.438	10	–	23	.303
Florida A&M	7	–	9	.438	9	–	25	.265
South Carolina State	6	–	10	.375	10	–	22	.313
Coppin State	5	–	11	.313	5	–	27	.156
Maryland Eastern Shore	3	–	13	.188	7	–	25	.219
Delaware State	2	–	14	.125	4	–	28	.125
† 2018 MEAC tournament winner

The 2017–18 Bethune–Cookman Wildcats men's basketball team represented Bethune-Cookman University during the 2017–18 NCAA Division I men's basketball season. The Wildcats, led by first-year head coach Ryan Ridder, played their home games at the Moore Gymnasium in Daytona Beach, Florida as members of the Mid-Eastern Athletic Conference. With a win over Florida A&M on March 1, 2018, the Wildcats earned a share of the MEAC regular season championship. They finished the season 18–14, 2–4 in MEAC play, finishing in a three-way tie for first. Due to tie-breaking procedures, they received the No. 2 seed in the MEAC tournament, where they lost to Morgan State in the quarterfinals.

== Previous season ==
The Wildcats finished the 2016–17 season 10–22, 6–10 in MEAC play to finish in tenth place. They defeated Delaware State before losing in the quarterfinals of the MEAC tournament to North Carolina Central.

On March 20, 2017, it was announced that head coach Gravelle Craig's contract would not be renewed. He finished at Bethune–Cookman with a six-year record of 74–123. The Wildcats hired Ryan Ridder from Daytona State of the NJCAA as the new head coach on March 31.

== Roster ==
2017–18 Bethune–Cookman Wildcats men's basketball team
Players
Coaches

Pos.	#	Name	Height	Weight	Year	Previous school	Hometown
G	1	Malik Maitland	5 ft 9 in (1.75 m)	175 lb (79 kg)	Jr	Father Lopez Catholic; Morehead State	Daytona Beach, Florida
G/F	2	Isaiah Bailey	6 ft 6 in (1.98 m)	205 lb (93 kg)	Jr	Compton; Angelina College	Compton, California
G/F	3	Brandon Tabb	6 ft 4 in (1.93 m)	180 lb (82 kg)	Sr	Kecoughtan; College of Central Florida	Hampton, Virginia
G/F	4	Armani Collins	6 ft 6 in (1.98 m)	180 lb (82 kg)	Jr	Stuart Hall; City College of San Francisco	San Francisco, California
F	5	Rodney Ross	6 ft 8 in (2.03 m)	225 lb (102 kg)	Sr	Pebblebrook; Gulf Coast State College	Atlanta, Georgia
F	11	Soufiyane Diakite	6 ft 6 in (1.98 m)	215 lb (98 kg)	Jr	Wings Academy; Morehead State	Bronx, New York
F	12	Shawntrez Davis	6 ft 9 in (2.06 m)	220 lb (100 kg)	Jr	Sound Doctrine Christian Academy; South Plains College	Atlanta, Georgia
G	15	QV Johnson	6 ft 3 in (1.91 m)	180 lb (82 kg)	Jr	Santa Ana College	Los Angeles
G	21	Jeffrey Altidort	6 ft 1 in (1.85 m)	180 lb (82 kg)	Sr	Coral Springs; Florida State College at Jacksonville	Coral Springs, Florida
G	22	Houston Smith	6 ft 4 in (1.93 m)	215 lb (98 kg)	So	Columbus Africentric	Columbus, Ohio
F	23	David Francis	6 ft 6 in (1.98 m)	215 lb (98 kg)	Jr	Boys and Girls; College of Southern Maryland	Brooklyn, New York
F	32	Ulmer Manzie	6 ft 8 in (2.03 m)	225 lb (102 kg)	RS So	Columbus Africentric	Columbus, Ohio
G	33	Jamal Gaines	6 ft 3 in (1.91 m)	190 lb (86 kg)	Sr	Booker (FL)	Sarasota, Florida

Head coach

- Ryan Ridder (Embry–Riddle)

Assistant coach(es)

- Dominique Taylor (East Texas A&M)
- Jeff Clapacs (Wooster)
- Woody Taylor (Eckerd)

Legend

- (C) Team captain
- (S) Suspended
- (I) Ineligible
- (W) Walk-on
- Injured
- Current redshirt

Roster
Last update: January 6, 2018

== Schedule and results ==
Date time, TV	Rank^{#}	Opponent^{#}	Result	Record	Site (attendance) city, state
Regular season
Nov 10, 2017*; 8:00 pm		Johnson (FL)	W 108–66	1–0	Moore Gymnasium (804); Daytona Beach, FL
Nov 13, 2017*; 8:00 pm		at Texas–Rio Grande Valley	L 74–92	1–1	UTRGV Fieldhouse (523); Edinburg, TX
Nov 16, 2017*; 8:00 pm		at North Texas; Ramblin' Wreck Showcase	L 78–90	1–2	The Super Pit (2,013); Denton, TX
Nov 19, 2017*; 2:00 pm, ACCN Extra		at Georgia Tech; Ramblin' Wreck Showcase	L 62–65	1–3	McCamish Pavilion (5,154); Atlanta, GA
Nov 21, 2017*; 7:00 pm		Grambling State	W 87–78	2–3	Moore Gymnasium (616); Daytona Beach, FL
Nov 25, 2017*; 4:00 pm		Florida College	W 95–67	3–3	Moore Gymnasium (401); Daytona Beach, FL
Nov 30, 2017*; 7:30 pm, ESPN3		at Jacksonville	W 77–66	4–3	Swisher Gymnasium (878); Jacksonville, FL
Dec 2, 2017*; 7:00 pm		at Florida Atlantic	L 75–93	4–4	FAU Arena (881); Boca Raton, FL
Dec 8, 2017*; 7:00 pm		Boston University	L 87–90	4–5	Moore Gymnasium (816); Daytona Beach, FL
Dec 12, 2017*; 7:00 pm		Cal Poly	W 67–53	5–5	Moore Gymnasium (704); Daytona Beach, FL
Dec 14, 2017*; 7:00 pm		at South Florida	L 63–83	5–6	USF Sun Dome (2,019); Tampa, FL
Dec 16, 2017*; 7:00 pm, ESPN3		at Kennesaw State	L 74–81	5–7	KSU Convocation Center (708); Kennesaw, GA
Dec 19, 2017*; 10:00 pm, P12N		at Washington	L 55–106	5–8	Alaska Airlines Arena (4,452); Seattle, WA
Dec 22, 2017*; 9:00 pm, P12N		at Washington State	L 58–86	5–9	Beasley Coliseum (2,178); Pullman, WA
Jan 3, 2018; 7:30 pm		South Carolina State	W 86–80	6–9 (1–0)	Moore Gymnasium (612); Daytona Beach, FL
Jan 6, 2018; 4:00 pm		at Howard	W 92–87	7–9 (2–0)	Charles E. Smith Center (478); Washington, D.C.
Jan 8, 2018; 7:30 pm		at Maryland Eastern Shore	W 89–84	8–9 (3–0)	Hytche Athletic Center (887); Princess Anne, MD
Jan 13, 2018; 4:00 pm		Florida A&M	W 99–81	9–9 (4–0)	Moore Gymnasium (904); Daytona Beach, FL
Jan 15, 2018*; 4:00 pm, ESPN3		at Stetson	W 74–62	10–9	Edmunds Center (732); DeLand, FL
Jan 20, 2018; 4:00 pm		at Delaware State	W 85–78	11–9 (5–0)	Memorial Hall (678); Dover, DE
Jan 27, 2018; 4:000 pm		at Norfolk State	L 70–71	11–10 (5–1)	Joseph G. Echols Memorial Hall (2,327); Norfolk, VA
Jan 29, 2018; 7:30 pm		at Hampton	L 69–80	11–11 (5–2)	Hampton Convocation Center (4.613); Hampton, VA
Feb 3, 2018; 4:00 pm		Coppin State	W 80–60	12–11 (6–2)	Moore Gymnasium (814); Daytona Beach, FL
Feb 5, 2018; 7:30 pm		Norfolk State	L 79–83	12–12 (6–3)	Moore Gymnasium (809); Daytona Beach, FL
Feb 10, 2018; 4:00 pm		Maryland Eastern Shore	W 87–67	13–12 (7–3)	Moore Gymnasium (902); Daytona Beach, FL
Feb 12, 2018; 7:30 pm		North Carolina Central	W 99–81	14–12 (8–3)	Moore Gymnasium (876); Daytona Beach, FL
Feb 17, 2018; 4:00 pm		at Coppin State	W 89–85	15–12 (9–3)	Physical Education Complex (2,230); Baltimore, MD
Feb 19, 2018; 7:30 pm		at Morgan State	W 96–95 ^{OT}	16–12 (10–3)	Talmadge L. Hill Field House (2,379); Baltimore, MD
Feb 24, 2018; 4:00 pm		Savannah State	W 121–92	17–12 (11–3)	Moore Gymnasium (898); Daytona Beach, FL
Feb 26, 2018; 7:30 pm		North Carolina A&T	L 80–86	17–13 (11–4)	Moore Gymnasium (943); Daytona Beach, FL
Mar 1, 2018; 7:30 pm		at Florida A&M	W 89–77	18–13 (12–4)	Lawson Center (5,217); Tallahassee, FL
MEAC tournament
Mar 7, 2018; 8:00 pm, ESPN3	(2)	vs. (7) Morgan State; Quarterfinals	L 77–78	18–14	Norfolk Scope; Norfolk, VA
*Non-conference game. ^{#}Rankings from AP Poll. (#) Tournament seedings in parentheses. All times are in Eastern Time.
