= 2017–18 South Carolina State Bulldogs basketball team =

American college basketball season

2017–18 South Carolina State Bulldogs basketball
- Conference: Mid-Eastern Athletic Conference
- Record: 10–22 (6–10 MEAC)
- Head coach: Murray Garvin (5th season)
- Assistant coaches: Rio Pitt; Trevor Deloach
- Home arena: SHM Memorial Center

2017–18 MEAC men's basketball standings
	Conf.				Overall
Team	W		L	PCT	W		L	PCT
Hampton	12	–	4	.750	19	–	16	.543
Bethune–Cookman	12	–	4	.750	18	–	14	.563
Savannah State	12	–	4	.750	15	–	17	.469
North Carolina A&T	11	–	5	.688	20	–	15	.571
Norfolk State	11	–	5	.688	14	–	19	.424
North Carolina Central †	9	–	7	.563	19	–	16	.543
Morgan State	7	–	9	.438	13	–	19	.406
Howard	7	–	9	.438	10	–	23	.303
Florida A&M	7	–	9	.438	9	–	25	.265
South Carolina State	6	–	10	.375	10	–	22	.313
Coppin State	5	–	11	.313	5	–	27	.156
Maryland Eastern Shore	3	–	13	.188	7	–	25	.219
Delaware State	2	–	14	.125	4	–	28	.125
† 2018 MEAC tournament winner

The 2017–18 South Carolina State Bulldogs basketball team represented South Carolina State University during the 2017–18 NCAA Division I men's basketball season. The Bulldogs, led by fifth-year head coach Murray Garvin, played their home games at the SHM Memorial Center in Orangeburg, South Carolina as members of the Mid-Eastern Athletic Conference. They finished the season 10–22, 6–10 in MEAC play to finish in 10th place. They lost to Morgan State in the first round of the MEAC tournament.

== Previous season ==
The Bulldogs finished the 2016–17 season 11–20, 7–9 in MEAC play to finish in a three-way tie for seventh place. They defeated Florida A&M in the MEAC tournament before losing in the quarterfinals to Norfolk State.

== Roster ==
2017–18 South Carolina State Bulldogs men's basketball team
Players
Coaches

Pos.	#	Name	Height	Weight	Year	Hometown
G	0	Lavar Harewood	6 ft 3 in (1.91 m)	195 lb (88 kg)	Jr	Brooklyn, New York
G	1	Justin Jones	6 ft 2 in (1.88 m)	185 lb (84 kg)	So	Myrtle Beach, South Carolina
F	2	Tashombe Riley	6 ft 7 in (2.01 m)	210 lb (95 kg)	Sr	Orangeburg, South Carolina
G	3	Rayshawn Neal	5 ft 10 in (1.78 m)	185 lb (84 kg)	Fr	Greenville, South Carolina
G	4	Dwayne Dwayne	5 ft 10 in (1.78 m)	180 lb (82 kg)	RS So	Baltimore, Maryland
F	5	Ozante Fields	6 ft 7 in (2.01 m)	220 lb (100 kg)	So	Denmark, South Carolina
G	10	James Richardson	6 ft 2 in (1.88 m)	185 lb (84 kg)	Sr	Darlington, South Carolina
G	11	Janai Raynor Powell	5 ft 10 in (1.78 m)	165 lb (75 kg)	Jr	Virginia Beach, Virginia
G	12	Tariq Clement	6 ft 0 in (1.83 m)	180 lb (82 kg)	Sr	Greenville, South Carolina
G	13	Donte Wright	5 ft 10 in (1.78 m)	190 lb (86 kg)	GS	Jackson, South Carolina
G	15	Patrell Rogers	6 ft 2 in (1.88 m)	180 lb (82 kg)	RS Sr	Florence, South Carolina
F	21	David Bottenberg	6 ft 8 in (2.03 m)	220 lb (100 kg)	So	Rockville, Maryland
G	23	Tyvoris Solomon	5 ft 10 in (1.78 m)	185 lb (84 kg)	RS Sr	Johns Island, South Carolina
F	24	Ian Kinard	6 ft 8 in (2.03 m)	210 lb (95 kg)	So	Clinton, South Carolina
F	33	Armani Taylor	6 ft 9 in (2.06 m)	305 lb (138 kg)	RS So	Moncks Corner, South Carolina
F	35	Damani Applewhite	6 ft 8 in (2.03 m)	200 lb (91 kg)	So	Fayetteville, North Carolina

Head coach

- Murray Garvin (Eastern Kentucky)

Assistant coach(es)

- Rio Pitt (South Carolina State)
- Trevor Deloach (UNC Wilmington)

Legend

- (C) Team captain
- (S) Suspended
- (I) Ineligible
- (W) Walk-on
- Injured
- Current redshirt

Roster
Last update: January 20, 2018

== Schedule and results ==
Date time, TV	Rank^{#}	Opponent^{#}	Result	Record	Site (attendance) city, state
Exhibition
Nov 02, 2017*; 7:00 pm		at Coastal Carolina	L 69–83		HTC Center; Conway, SC
Non-conference regular season
Nov 10, 2017*; 6:00 pm, BTN+		at Wisconsin; CBE Hall of Fame Classic	L 50–85	0–1	Kohl Center (17,287); Madison, WI
Nov 12, 2017*; 1:00 pm, ACCN Extra		at Boston College; CBE Hall of Fame Classic	L 52–91	0–2	Conte Forum (3,104); Chestnut Hill, MA
Nov 14, 2017*; 7:00 pm		at Yale; CBE Hall of Fame Classic	L 54–86	0–3	John J. Lee Amphitheater (811); New Haven, CT
Nov 17, 2017*; 6:00 pm, P12N		at No. 23 UCLA; CBE Hall of Fame Classic	L 68–96	0–4	Pauley Pavilion (7,035); Los Angeles, CA
Nov 21, 2017*; 7:30 pm		Central Arkansas	L 64–73	0–5	SHM Memorial Center (254); Orangeburg, SC
Nov 26, 2017*; 7:00 pm		at Winthrop	L 61–86	0–6	Winthrop Coliseum (1,107); Rock Hill, SC
Nov 28, 2017*; 7:00 pm		Morris	W 100–91	1–6	SHM Memorial Center; Orangeburg, SC
Dec 2, 2017*; 12:00 pm, RSN		at NC State	L 71–103	1–7	PNC Arena (13,842); Raleigh, NC
Dec 5, 2017*; 7:00 pm		at Presbyterian	L 77–88	1–8	Templeton Center (208); Clinton, SC
Dec 7, 2017*; 6:00 pm		Brevard	W 93–65	2–8	SHM Memorial Center (189); Orangeburg, SC
Dec 9, 2017*; 4:00 pm, ESPN3		at Furman	L 72–101	2–9	Timmons Arena (1,325); Greenville, SC
Dec 12, 2017*; 1:00 pm		Charleston Southern	W 91–88 ^{OT}	3–9	SHM Memorial Center (154); Orangeburg, SC
Dec 16, 2017*; 4:00 pm		Jacksonville	W 83–74	4–9	SHM Memorial Center; Orangeburg, SC
Dec 19, 2017*; 7:00 pm		at College of Charleston	L 64–80	4–10	TD Arena (3,195); Charleston, SC
Dec 21, 2017*; 7:00 pm, ESPN3		at UCF	L 64–89	4–11	CFE Arena (3,055); Orlando, FL
MEAC regular season
Jan 3, 2018; 7:30 pm		at Bethune–Cookman	L 80–86	4–12 (0–1)	Moore Gymnasium (612); Daytona Beach, FL
Jan 6, 2018; 4:00 pm		at Delaware State	W 63–60	5–12 (1–1)	Memorial Hall (319); Dover, DE
Jan 13, 2018; 4:00 pm		Howard	W 91–88 ^{OT}	6–12 (2–1)	SHM Memorial Center; Orangeburg, SC
Jan 15, 2018; 7:30 pm		Maryland Eastern Shore	W 66–62	7–12 (3–1)	SHM Memorial Center (298); Orangeburg, SC
Jan 20, 2018; 4:00 pm		Norfolk State	L 54–78	7–13 (3–2)	SHM Memorial Center (357); Orangeburg, SC
Jan 22, 2018; 7:30 pm		Hampton	L 84–91	7–14 (3–3)	SHM Memorial Center; Orangeburg, SC
Jan 27, 2018; 4:00 pm		at Coppin State	L 65–73	7–15 (3–4)	Physical Education Complex (1,100); Baltimore, MD
Jan 29, 2018; 7:30 pm		at Morgan State	W 74–59	8–15 (4–4)	Talmadge L. Hill Field House (3,109); Baltimore, MD
Feb 3, 2018; 6:00 pm		at Savannah State	L 99–111	8–16 (4–5)	Tiger Arena (2,375); Savannah, GA
Feb 5, 2018; 7:30 pm		Coppin State	L 60–84	8–17 (4–6)	SHM Memorial Center; Orangeburg, SC
Feb 10, 2018; 4:00 pm		North Carolina A&T	W 90–85	9–17 (5–6)	SHM Memorial Center; Orangeburg, SC
Feb 17, 2018; 6:00 pm		at Hampton	L 66–79	9–18 (5–7)	Hampton Convocation Center (4,254); Hampton, VA
Feb 19, 2018; 8:00 pm		at Norfolk State	L 62–76	9–19 (5–8)	Joseph G. Echols Memorial Hall (1,343); Norfolk, VA
Feb 24, 2018; 4:00 pm		North Carolina Central	W 102–79	10–19 (6–8)	SHM Memorial Center (655); Orangeburg, SC
Feb 26, 2018; 8:00 pm		at Florida A&M	L 74–76	10–20 (6–9)	Lawson Center (1,918); Tallahassee, FL
Mar 1, 2018; 7:30 pm		at Savannah State	L 81–94	10–21 (6–10)	SHM Memorial Center; Orangeburg, SC
MEAC tournament
Mar 6, 2018; 9:00 pm	(10)	vs. (7) Morgan State; First round	L 80–83	10–22	Norfolk Scope; Norfolk, VA
*Non-conference game. ^{#}Rankings from AP Poll. (#) Tournament seedings in parentheses. All times are in Eastern Time.
