= 2017–18 Delaware State Hornets men's basketball team =

American college basketball season

2017–18 Delaware State Hornets men's basketball
- Conference: Mid-Eastern Athletic Conference
- Record: 4–28 (2–14 MEAC)
- Head coach: Keith Walker (First 28 games); Keith Johnson (interim)
- Assistant coaches: Kevin Washington; Arthur Tyson
- Home arena: Memorial Hall

2017–18 MEAC men's basketball standings
	Conf.				Overall
Team	W		L	PCT	W		L	PCT
Hampton	12	–	4	.750	19	–	16	.543
Bethune–Cookman	12	–	4	.750	18	–	14	.563
Savannah State	12	–	4	.750	15	–	17	.469
North Carolina A&T	11	–	5	.688	20	–	15	.571
Norfolk State	11	–	5	.688	14	–	19	.424
North Carolina Central †	9	–	7	.563	19	–	16	.543
Morgan State	7	–	9	.438	13	–	19	.406
Howard	7	–	9	.438	10	–	23	.303
Florida A&M	7	–	9	.438	9	–	25	.265
South Carolina State	6	–	10	.375	10	–	22	.313
Coppin State	5	–	11	.313	5	–	27	.156
Maryland Eastern Shore	3	–	13	.188	7	–	25	.219
Delaware State	2	–	14	.125	4	–	28	.125
† 2018 MEAC tournament winner

The 2017–18 Delaware State Hornets men's basketball team represented Delaware State University during the 2017–18 NCAA Division I men's basketball season. The Hornets, led by fourth-year head coach Keith Walker, played their home games at Memorial Hall in Dover, Delaware as members of the Mid-Eastern Athletic Conference.

The Hornets finished 4–28, 2–14 in the MEAC play to finish in last place. They lost in the first round of the MEAC tournament to North Carolina A&T. They lost every game on the road and on a neutral court, with both of their non-conference victories coming against non-Division I schools. They had the dubious distinction of finishing the season 351st in RPI out of the 351 teams in the NCAA.

On February 22, 2018, head coach Keith Walker was fired and associate head coach Keith Johnson was named interim head coach for the remainder of the season. On July 26, 5 months after Walker was fired, the school hired UMBC assistant Eric Skeeters for the head coaching job.

== Previous season ==
The Hornets finished the 2016–17 season 10–22, 7–9 in MEAC play to finish in a three-way tie for seventh place. They lost in the first round of the MEAC tournament to Bethune–Cookman.

== Roster ==
2017–18 Delaware State Hornets men's basketball team
Players
Coaches

Pos.	#	Name	Height	Weight	Year	Hometown
F	1	Marquis Collins	6 ft 7 in (2.01 m)	215 lb (98 kg)	Sr	Chester, Pennsylvania
G	2	Jamelle Christian	6 ft 1 in (1.85 m)	190 lb (86 kg)	RS Jr	Washington, D.C.
F/C	3	Joseph Lewis	6 ft 9 in (2.06 m)	225 lb (102 kg)	Sr	Detroit, Michigan
G	4	Johquin "Pinky" Wiley	5 ft 11 in (1.8 m)	175 lb (79 kg)	Fr	Chesterfield, Virginia
G	5	Kobe Gantz	6 ft 4 in (1.93 m)	180 lb (82 kg)	So	Lancaster, Pennsylvania
F	10	Kavon Waller	6 ft 5 in (1.96 m)	210 lb (95 kg)	Sr	Chester, Virginia
G	11	Jonathan Walker	6 ft 3 in (1.91 m)	185 lb (84 kg)	Sr	Lithia Springs, Georgia
G	13	Myles Carter	6 ft 1 in (1.85 m)	170 lb (77 kg)	Fr	Philadelphia, Pennsylvania
F	15	Ameer Bennett	6 ft 8 in (2.03 m)	220 lb (100 kg)	Fr	Richmond, Virginia
G	21	Sleik Edwards	6 ft 3 in (1.91 m)	210 lb (95 kg)	Jr	Winterville, North Carolina
G	22	Matthew Stevenson	6 ft 2 in (1.88 m)	175 lb (79 kg)	RS Fr	Winston-Salem, North Carolina
F	23	Simon Okolue	6 ft 10 in (2.08 m)	230 lb (104 kg)	Jr	Laguna Niguel, California
F	24	Artem Tavakalyan	6 ft 6 in (1.98 m)	210 lb (95 kg)	Sr	Moscow, Russia
F/C	25	Kevin Noulowe	6 ft 9 in (2.06 m)	240 lb (109 kg)	So	Gaithersburg, Maryland
F/C	32	Daivon Gamble	6 ft 5 in (1.96 m)	235 lb (107 kg)	Jr
C	50	Demola Onifade	6 ft 9 in (2.06 m)	245 lb (111 kg)	Jr	Lagos, Nigeria
C	55	Reginald Giles	6 ft 9 in (2.06 m)	215 lb (98 kg)	So	Dover, Delaware
G		Jonathan Mitchell	6 ft 4 in (1.93 m)	210 lb (95 kg)	So	Waterbury, Connecticut

Head coach

- Keith Johnson (Cheyney)

Assistant coach(es)

- Kevin Washington (St. Augustine's)
- Arthur Tyson (North Carolina Central)

Legend

- (C) Team captain
- (S) Suspended
- (I) Ineligible
- (W) Walk-on
- Injured
- Current redshirt

Roster
Last update: January 10, 2018

== Schedule and results ==
Date time, TV	Rank^{#}	Opponent^{#}	Result	Record	Site (attendance) city, state
Non-conference regular season
Nov 10, 2017*; 7:30 pm		Cairn	W 71–50	1–0	Memorial Hall (1,010); Dover, DE
Nov 13, 2017*; 8:00 pm, FS2		at DePaul	L 57–81	1–1	Wintrust Arena (4,527); Chicago, IL
Nov 15, 2017*; 7:00 pm, CN81		at Fort Wayne; Adolph Rupp Classic	L 71–85	1–2	Memorial Coliseum (1,353); Fort Wayne, IN
Nov 16, 2017*; 8:00 pm, ESPN3		at UIC; Adolph Rupp Classic	L 55–95	1–3	UIC Pavilion (1,537); Chicago, IL
Nov 20, 2017*; 7:00 pm, 3,562		at East Tennessee State; Adolph Rupp Classic	L 57–81	1–4	Freedom Hall Civic Center (3,562); Johnson City, TN
Nov 25, 2017*; 4:00 pm		Georgian Court	W 68–55	2–4	Memorial Hall (348); Dover, DE
Nov 27, 2017*; 8:00 pm		at Troy; Adolph Rupp Classic	L 64–95	2–5	Trojan Arena (1,201); Troy, AL
Nov 29, 2017*; 8:00 pm		Binghamton	L 64–85	2–6	Memorial Hall (735); Dover, DE
Dec 2, 2017*; 5:00 pm		at East Carolina	L 57–63	2–7	Williams Arena (3,195); Greenville, NC
Dec 6, 2017*; 6:30 pm		UMBC	L 60–81	2–8	Memorial Hall (847); Dover, DE
Dec 09, 2017*; 12:00 pm		at Duquesne	L 48–97	2–9	Palumbo Center (1,213); Pittsburgh, PA
Dec 17, 2017*; 8:00 pm		Delaware; Route 1 Rivalry	L 59–68 ^{OT}	2–10	Memorial Hall (527); Dover, DE
Dec 19, 2017*; 7:00 pm, ACCN Extra		at Pittsburgh	L 68–74	2–11	Petersen Events Center (2,372); Pittsburgh, PA
Dec 22, 2017*; 8:00 pm, BTN Plus		at Nebraska	L 68–85	2–12	Pinnacle Bank Arena (10,431); Lincoln, NE
Dec 27, 2017*; 7:00 pm, ESPN3		at Penn	L 52–105	2–13	Palestra (2,011); Philadelphia, PA
MEAC regular season
Jan 3, 2018; 7:30 pm		North Carolina Central	L 62–65	2–14 (0–1)	Memorial Hall (249); Dover, DE
Jan 6, 2018; 4:00 pm		South Carolina State	L 60–63	2–15 (0–2)	Memorial Hall (319); Dover, DE
Jan 8, 2018; 7:30 pm		North Carolina A&T	L 66–76	2–16 (0–3)	Memorial Hall (536); Dover, DE
Jan 12, 2018; 7:00 pm		at Hampton	L 56–78	2–17 (0–4)	Hampton Convocation Center (4,123); Hampton, VA
Jan 15, 2018; 8:00 pm		at Florida A&M	L 89–94 ^{2OT}	2–18 (0–5)	Lawson Center (2,487); Tallahassee, FL
Jan 20, 2018; 4:00 pm		Bethune–Cookman	L 78–85	2–19 (0–6)	Memorial Hall (678); Dover, DE
Jan 22, 2018; 7:30 pm		at Morgan State	L 47–61	2–20 (0–7)	Talmadge L. Hill Field House (3,286); Baltimore, MD
Jan 27, 2018; 4:00 pm		Savannah State	L 86–106	2–21 (0–8)	Memorial Hall (537); Dover, DE
Feb 3, 2018; 4:00 pm		at North Carolina Central	L 61–72	2–22 (0–9)	McDougald–McLendon Gymnasium (1,623); Durham, NC
Feb 5, 2018; 7:30 pm, Lock TV		at North Carolina A&T	L 51–54	2–23 (0–10)	Corbett Sports Center (1,094); Greensboro, NC
Feb 12, 2018; 8:00 pm		at Norfolk State	L 58–93	2–24 (0–11)	Joseph G. Echols Memorial Hall (1,736); Norfolk, VA
Feb 17, 2018; 4:00 pm		Florida A&M	L 63–66	2–25 (0–12)	Memorial Hall (854); Dover, DE
Feb 19, 2018; 7:30 pm		Coppin State	W 69–51	3–25 (1–12)	Memorial Hall (874); Dover, DE
Feb 24, 2018; 4:00 pm		at Howard	L 74–93	3–26 (1–13)	Charles E. Smith Center; Washington, D.C.
Feb 26, 2018; 7:30 pm		at Maryland Eastern Shore	L 47–59	3–27 (1–14)	Hytche Athletic Center (2,205); Princess Anne, MD
Mar 1, 2018; 7:30 pm		Morgan State	W 87–80	4–27 (2–14)	Memorial Hall (997); Dover, DE
MEAC tournament
Mar 5, 2018; 6:30 pm	(13)	vs. (4) North Carolina A&T; First round	L 61–62	4–28	Norfolk Scope; Norfolk, VA
*Non-conference game. ^{#}Rankings from AP Poll. (#) Tournament seedings in parentheses. All times are in Eastern Time.
