= 2017–18 Hampton Pirates basketball team =

American college basketball season

2017–18 Hampton Pirates men's basketball
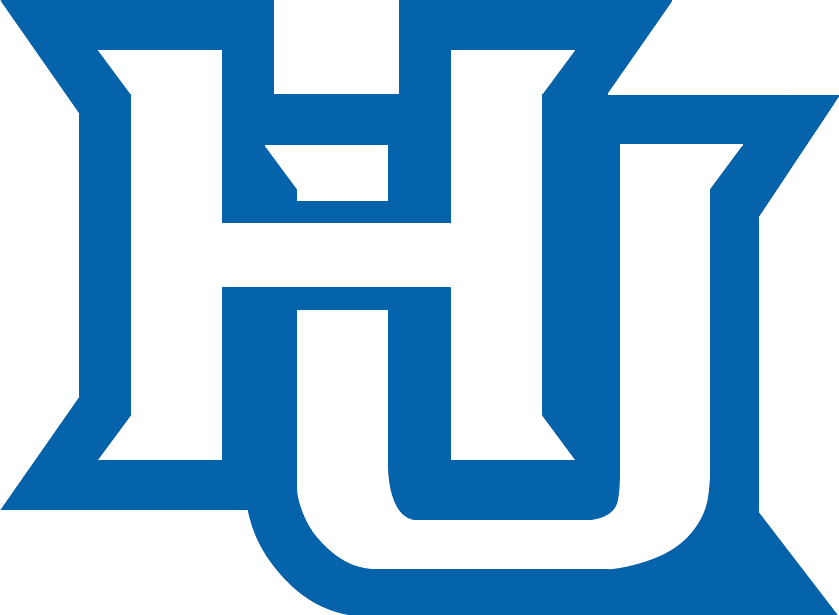

MEAC regular-season co-champions

NIT, first round
- Conference: Mid-Eastern Athletic Conference
- Record: 19–16 (12–4 MEAC)
- Head coach: Edward Joyner (9th season)
- Assistant coaches: Darryl Sharp; Matthew Hamilton; Brian Graves
- Home arena: Hampton Convocation Center

2017–18 MEAC men's basketball standings
	Conf.				Overall
Team	W		L	PCT	W		L	PCT
Hampton	12	–	4	.750	19	–	16	.543
Bethune–Cookman	12	–	4	.750	18	–	14	.563
Savannah State	12	–	4	.750	15	–	17	.469
North Carolina A&T	11	–	5	.688	20	–	15	.571
Norfolk State	11	–	5	.688	14	–	19	.424
North Carolina Central †	9	–	7	.563	19	–	16	.543
Morgan State	7	–	9	.438	13	–	19	.406
Howard	7	–	9	.438	10	–	23	.303
Florida A&M	7	–	9	.438	9	–	25	.265
South Carolina State	6	–	10	.375	10	–	22	.313
Coppin State	5	–	11	.313	5	–	27	.156
Maryland Eastern Shore	3	–	13	.188	7	–	25	.219
Delaware State	2	–	14	.125	4	–	28	.125
† 2018 MEAC tournament winner

The 2017–18 Hampton Pirates men's basketball team represented Hampton University during the 2017–18 NCAA Division I men's basketball season. The Pirates, led by ninth-year head coach Edward Joyner, played their home games at the Hampton Convocation Center in Hampton, Virginia as members of the Mid-Eastern Athletic Conference (MEAC). They finished the season 19–16, 12–4 in MEAC play, to finish in a three-way tie for the MEAC regular-season championship. After tiebreakers, they received the No. 1 seed in the MEAC tournament where they Florida A&M and North Carolina A&T to advance to the championship game where they lost to North Carolina Central. As a regular-season conference champion, and No. 1 seed in their conference tournament, who failed to win their conference tournament, they received an automatic bid to the National Invitation Tournament where they lost in the first round to Notre Dame.

This season was the Pirates' final season as members of the MEAC, as the school announced on November 16, 2017 that they will be joining the Big South Conference for the 2018–19 season.

== Previous season ==
The Pirates finished the 2016–17 season 14–17, 11–5 in MEAC play, to finish in a tie for third place. They lost in the quarterfinals of the MEAC tournament to Maryland Eastern Shore. They were invited to the College Basketball Invitational where they lost in the first round to Coastal Carolina.

== Preseason ==
The Pirates were picked to finish fourth in the MEAC in a preseason poll of coaches and sports information directors. Sophomore guard Jermaine Marrow was named to the preseason All-MEAC second team.

== Roster ==
2017–18 Hampton Pirates men's basketball team
Players
Coaches

Pos.	#	Name	Height	Weight	Year	Previous school	Hometown
G	2	Jermaine Marrow	6 ft 0 in (1.83 m)	182 lb (83 kg)	So	Heritage HS	Newport News, VA
G/F	3	Trey Carver	6 ft 5 in (1.96 m)	230 lb (104 kg)	So	Northeastern HS	Elizabeth City, NC
G	4	Greg Heckstall	6 ft 6 in (1.98 m)	195 lb (88 kg)	So	Norview HS; Bryant & Stratton College	Norfolk, VA
C	5	Pierre Sow	7 ft 0 in (2.13 m)	215 lb (98 kg)	Fr	Teaneck HS	Teaneck, NJ
G/F	11	Trey Houston	6 ft 0 in (1.83 m)	155 lb (70 kg)	RS So	Roswell HS	Atlanta, GA
F	20	AJ Astroth	6 ft 6 in (1.98 m)	200 lb (91 kg)	GS	Wharton HS; Towson; Vanderbilt	Tampa, FL
G	21	Devon Oakley	6 ft 3 in (1.91 m)	185 lb (84 kg)	Jr	Nansemond River HS	Chesapeake, VA
F	22	Trevond Barnes	6 ft 9 in (2.06 m)	210 lb (95 kg)	Jr	Lafayette HS	Lafayette, AL
G	23	Kalin Fisher	6 ft 2 in (1.88 m)	180 lb (82 kg)	Jr	Proviso East HS	Chicago, IL
F	24	Austin Colbert	6 ft 8 in (2.03 m)	202 lb (92 kg)	RS Jr	Old Dominion; Illinois	Chesapeake, VA
G	25	Akim Mitchell	6 ft 5 in (1.96 m)	200 lb (91 kg)	Jr	Carlisle HS	Charlotte, NC
F	31	Charles Wilson-Fisher	6 ft 9 in (2.06 m)	205 lb (93 kg)	Sr	Quality Education Academy	Los Angeles, CA
G	33	Lysander Bracey	6 ft 4 in (1.93 m)	156 lb (71 kg)	So	Northside Christian Academy	Charlotte, NC
G	45	Eugene III Marshall	6 ft 3 in (1.91 m)	170 lb (77 kg)	RS So	Hackensack HS	Hackensack, NJ

Head coach

- Edward Joyner Jr. (Hampton)

Assistant coach(es)

- Darryl Sharp (Bloomsburg)
- Matthew Hamilton (Appalachian State)
- Brian Graves (Catawba)

Legend

- (C) Team captain
- (S) Suspended
- (I) Ineligible
- (W) Walk-on
- Injured
- Current redshirt

Roster
Last update: May 29, 2025

== Accolades ==
Preseason All MEAC 2nd Team

- Jermaine Marrow

MEAC Player of the Week

- Jermaine Marrow (November 27)

MEAC Defensive Player of the Week

- Trevond Barnes (December 11)

== Schedule and results ==
Date time, TV	Rank^{#}	Opponent^{#}	Result	Record	Site (attendance) city, state
Exhibition
November 6, 2017*; 7:00 p.m.		Newport News Apprentice School; Puerto Rico Hurricane Relief	W 90–43		Hampton Convocation Center; Hampton, VA
Non-conference regular season
November 10, 2017*; 8:00 p.m.		at Rider	L 75–90	0–1	Alumni Gymnasium (1,600); Lawrenceville, NJ
November 12, 2017*; 5:00 p.m.		Bluefield	W 85–68	1–1	Hampton Convocation Center (4,123); Hampton, VA
November 15, 2017*; 7:00 p.m.		at William & Mary	L 76–83	1–2	Kaplan Arena (2,001); Williamsburg, VA
November 18, 2017*; 2:00 p.m.		at George Washington; Las Vegas Classic	L 57–65	1–3	Charles E. Smith Center (2,636); Washington, D.C.
November 20, 2018*; 8:30 p.m., FS1		at No. 15 Xavier; Las Vegas Classic	L 60–96	1–4	Cintas Center (10,224); Cincinnati, OH
November 23, 2017*; 2:00 p.m.		vs. Northern Arizona; Las Vegas Classic	W 76–66	2–4	Orleans Arena (3,245); Paradise, NV
November 24, 2017*; 10:00 p.m.		vs. Rider; Las Vegas Classic	L 80–94	2–5	Orleans Arena (3,325); Paradise, NV
November 27, 2017*; 7:00 p.m.		Saint Leo	W 72–56	3–5	Hampton Convocation Center (3,512); Hampton, VA
November 29, 2017*; 7:00 p.m.		Mid-Atlantic Christian	W 115–74	4–5	Hampton Convocation Center (3,124); Hampton, VA
December 6, 2017*; 7:00 p.m.		Coastal Carolina	L 81–85	4–6	Hampton Convocation Center (3,123); Hampton, VA
December 8, 2017*; 8:00 p.m., ESPN3		at Missouri State	L 75–88	4–7	JQH Arena (4,612); Springfield, MO
December 17, 2017*; 2:00 p.m.		Gardner–Webb	L 79–80	4–8	Hampton Convocation Center (3,112); Hampton, VA
December 20, 2017*; 7:00 p.m.		Appalachian State	W 86–53	5–8	Hampton Convocation Center (2,145); Hampton, VA
December 22, 2017*; 7:00 p.m., ACCN Extra		at No. 13 Virginia	L 48–82	5–9	John Paul Jones Arena (13,328); Charlottesville, VA
December 30, 2017*; 8:00 p.m.		at Texas–Rio Grande Valley	L 69–80	5–10	UTRGV Fieldhouse (546); Edinburg, TX
MEAC regular season
January 6, 2018; 4:00 p.m.		at Maryland Eastern Shore	L 83–92	5–11 (0–1)	Hytche Athletic Center (924); Princess Anne, MD
January 8, 2018; 7:30 p.m.		at Howard; Battle of the Real HU; Postponed to February 8 due to winter storm			Burr Gymnasium; Washington, D.C.
January 12, 2018; 7:00 p.m.		Delaware State	W 78–56	6–11 (1–1)	Hampton Convocation Center (4,123); Hampton, VA
January 20, 2018; 6:00 p.m.		at Savannah State	L 101–103	6–12 (1–2)	Tiger Arena (2,219); Savannah, GA
January 22, 2018; 7:30 p.m.		at South Carolina State	W 91–84	7–12 (2–2)	SHM Memorial Center; Orangeburg, SC
January 27, 2018; 6:00 p.m.		Florida A&M	L 71–75	7–13 (2–3)	Hampton Convocation Center (5,234); Hampton, VA
January 29, 2018; 7:00 p.m.		Bethune–Cookman	W 80–69	8–13 (3–3)	Hampton Convocation Center (4,613); Hampton, VA
January 31, 2018; 7:00 p.m.		Coppin State	W 70–59 ^{OT}	9–13 (4–3)	Hampton Convocation Center (4,515); Hampton, VA
February 3, 2018; 4:00 p.m.		at North Carolina A&T	L 84–92	9–14 (4–4)	Corbett Sports Center (1,953); Greensboro, NC
February 5, 2018; 7:00 p.m., ESPNU		at North Carolina Central	W 86–70	10–14 (5–4)	McDougald–McLendon Gymnasium (1,474); Durham, NC
February 8, 2018; 7:30 p.m.		at Howard; Battle of the Real HU	W 95–81	11–14 (6–4)	Burr Gymnasium (2,500); Washington, D.C.
February 10, 2018; 6:00 p.m.		Norfolk State	W 82–52	12–14 (7–4)	Hampton Convocation Center (7,213); Hampton, VA
February 12, 2018; 7:30 p.m.		at Coppin State	W 82–79	13–14 (8–4)	Physical Education Complex (898); Baltimore, MD
February 17, 2018; 6:00 p.m.		South Carolina State	W 79–66	14–14 (9–4)	Hampton Convocation Center (4,254); Hampton, VA
February 19, 2018; 7:00 p.m.		Savannah State	W 114–102 ^{OT}	15–14 (10–4)	Hampton Convocation Center (4,511); Hampton, VA
February 24, 2018; 6:00 p.m.		Morgan State; Forfeit	W 2–0	16–14 (11–4)	Hampton Convocation Center (5,267); Hampton, VA
March 1, 2018; 8:00 p.m.		at Norfolk State	W 74–71	17–14 (12–4)	Joseph G. Echols Memorial Hall (4,500); Norfolk, VA
MEAC tournament
March 7, 2018; 6:00 p.m., ESPN3	(1)	vs. (9) Florida A&M; Quarterfinals	W 75–71	18–14	Norfolk Scope; Norfolk, VA
March 9, 2018; 6:00 p.m., ESPN3	(1)	vs. (4) North Carolina A&T; Semifinals	W 96–86	19–14	Norfolk Scope; Norfolk, VA
March 10, 2018; 1:00 p.m., ESPN2	(1)	vs. (6) North Carolina Central; Championship	L 63–71	19–15	Norfolk Scope (6,036); Norfolk, VA
NIT
March 13, 2018*; 9:00 p.m., ESPN	(8)	at (1) Notre Dame; First round – Notre Dame Bracket	L 63–84	19–16	Edmund P. Joyce Center (2,101); South Bend, IN
*Non-conference game. ^{#}Rankings from AP poll. (#) Tournament seedings in parentheses. All times are in Eastern.
