= 2017–18 Coppin State Eagles men's basketball team =

American college basketball season

2017–18 Coppin State Eagles men's basketball
- Conference: Mid-Eastern Athletic Conference
- Record: 5–27 (5–11 MEAC)
- Head coach: Juan Dixon (1st season)
- Assistant coaches: John Auslander; Philip Gaetano
- Home arena: Physical Education Complex

2017–18 MEAC men's basketball standings
| | Conf. | | | | Overall |
| Team | W | | L | PCT | W | | L | PCT |
|---|---|---|---|---|---|---|---|---|
| Hampton | 12 | – | 4 | .750 | 19 | – | 16 | .543 |
| Bethune–Cookman | 12 | – | 4 | .750 | 18 | – | 14 | .563 |
| Savannah State | 12 | – | 4 | .750 | 15 | – | 17 | .469 |
| North Carolina A&T | 11 | – | 5 | .688 | 20 | – | 15 | .571 |
| Norfolk State | 11 | – | 5 | .688 | 14 | – | 19 | .424 |
| North Carolina Central † | 9 | – | 7 | .563 | 19 | – | 16 | .543 |
| Morgan State | 7 | – | 9 | .438 | 13 | – | 19 | .406 |
| Howard | 7 | – | 9 | .438 | 10 | – | 23 | .303 |
| Florida A&M | 7 | – | 9 | .438 | 9 | – | 25 | .265 |
| South Carolina State | 6 | – | 10 | .375 | 10 | – | 22 | .313 |
| Coppin State | 5 | – | 11 | .313 | 5 | – | 27 | .156 |
| Maryland Eastern Shore | 3 | – | 13 | .188 | 7 | – | 25 | .219 |
| Delaware State | 2 | – | 14 | .125 | 4 | – | 28 | .125 |
† 2018 MEAC tournament winner

The 2017–18 Coppin State Eagles men's basketball team represented Coppin State University during the 2017–18 NCAA Division I men's basketball season. The Eagles, led by first-year head coach Juan Dixon, played their home games at the Physical Education Complex in Baltimore, Maryland as members of the Mid-Eastern Athletic Conference. They finished the season 5–27, 5–11 in MEAC play to finish in 11th place. They lost in the first round of the MEAC tournament to North Carolina Central.

== Previous season ==
The Eagles finished the 2016–17 season 8–24, 7–9 in MEAC play to finish in a three-way tie for seventh place. They lost in the first round of the MEAC tournament to Howard.

On March 20, 2017, it was announced that head coach Michael Grant's contract would not be renewed. He finished at Coppin State with a three-year record of 25–69. The school hired Baltimore native and former Maryland All-American player Juan Dixon as the new head coach on April 22.

== Roster ==
2017–18 Coppin State Eagles men's basketball team
Players
Coaches

| Pos. | # | Name | Height | Weight | Year | Hometown |
|---|---|---|---|---|---|---|---|
| F | 0 | Adam Traore | 6 ft 5 in (1.96 m) | 215 lb (98 kg) | RS Jr | Broward CC | New York, NY |
| F/C | 1 | Chad Andrews-Fulton | 6 ft 7 in (2.01 m) | 215 lb (98 kg) | Jr | Baltimore Cityc CC | Philadelphia, PA |
| G | 2 | Taquain Drummond | 6 ft 4 in (1.93 m) | 180 lb (82 kg) | RS Fr | Woodside HS | Newport News, VA |
| G | 3 | Dejuan Clayton | 6 ft 2 in (1.88 m) | 175 lb (79 kg) | So | St. John's College HS | Bowie, MD |
| G | 4 | Tre' Thomas | 6 ft 3 in (1.91 m) | 180 lb (82 kg) | Jr | Baltimore City CC | Largo, Maryland |
| F | 5 | Cedric Council | 6 ft 8 in (2.03 m) | 210 lb (95 kg) | Jr | Gordon State | Kennesaw, GA |
| G | 10 | Karonn Davis | 6 ft 2 in (1.88 m) | 205 lb (93 kg) | Sr | Niagara | Philadelphia, PA |
| F | 15 | Blake Simpson | 6 ft 7 in (2.01 m) | 230 lb (104 kg) | Sr | La Salle HS | Cincinnati, OH |
| F | 20 | Jordan Hardwick | 6 ft 7 in (2.01 m) | 197 lb (89 kg) | Fr | Springfield Commonwealth Academy | Wethersfield, CT |
| G | 21 | Lucian Brownlee | 6 ft 2 in (1.88 m) | 165 lb (75 kg) | Jr | Haddon Heights HS | Lawnside, NJ |
| G/F | 22 | Lamar Morgan | 6 ft 6 in (1.98 m) | 185 lb (84 kg) | Jr | Mineral Area CC | Willingboro, NJ |
| G/F | 23 | Kent Auslander | 6 ft 6 in (1.98 m) | 200 lb (91 kg) | Sr | Maryland | Herndon, VA |
| G | 24 | Keandre Fair | 6 ft 1 in (1.85 m) | 190 lb (86 kg) | Fr | Weaver HS | Hartford, CT |
| G | 32 | Donnell Frayer | 6 ft 2 in (1.88 m) | 170 lb (77 kg) | Fr | Landon School | Upper Marlboro, MD |

Head coach

- Juan Dixon (Maryland)

Assistant coach(es)

- Jahn Auslander (Maryland)
- Philip Gaetano (Sacred Heart)

Legend

- (C) Team captain
- (S) Suspended
- (I) Ineligible
- (W) Walk-on
- Injured
- Current redshirt

Roster
Last update: January 11, 2018

== Schedule and results ==
| Date time, TV | Rank^{#} | Opponent^{#} | Result | Record | Site (attendance) city, state |
Non-conference regular season
| Nov 10, 2017*; 11:59 pm, P12N | | at Oregon | L 54–70 | 0–1 | Matthew Knight Arena (7,232); Eugene, OR |
| Nov 12, 2017*; 5:00 pm | | at East Carolina; Showcase on the Banks | L 50–76 | 0–2 | Williams Arena (3,228); Greenville, NC |
| Nov 16, 2017*; 7:00 pm, ESPN3 | | at No. 12 Cincinnati | L 54–97 | 0–3 | BB&T Arena (7,158); Highland Heights, KY |
| Nov 17, 2017*; 7:00 pm, ESPN3 | | at Cleveland State; Showcase on the Banks | L 56–80 | 0–4 | Wolstein Center (1,931); Cleveland, OH |
| Nov 19, 2017*; 12:00 pm, BTN+ | | at Rutgers; Showcase on the Banks | L 39–64 | 0–5 | Louis Brown Athletic Center (3,514); Piscataway, NJ |
| Nov 21, 2017*; 7:00 pm | | at Central Connecticut; Showcase on the Banks | L 71–74 | 0–6 | William H. Detrick Gymnasium (1,212); New Britain, CT |
| Dec 1, 2017*; 7:00 pm, ESPN3 | | at Ohio | L 37–80 | 0–7 | Convocation Center (4,137); Athens, OH |
| Dec 3, 2017*; 6:45 pm, FS1 | | at Georgetown; BB&T Classic | L 60–76 | 0–8 | Capital One Arena (6,335); Washington, D.C. |
| Dec 6, 2017*; 7:00 pm | | Navy | L 53–70 | 0–9 | Physical Education Complex (1,462); Baltimore, MD |
| Dec 9, 2017*; 2:00 pm, ESPNews | | at UConn | L 59–72 | 0–10 | Harry A. Gampel Pavilion (3,046); Storrs, CT |
| Dec 12, 2017*; 7:00 pm, ESPN3 | | at UMBC | L 74–81 | 0–11 | Retriever Activities Center (1,166); Baltimore, MD |
| Dec 20, 2017*; 7:00 pm, ATTSN | | at No. 10 West Virginia | L 38–77 | 0–12 | WVU Coliseum (8,102); Morgantown, WV |
| Dec 22, 2017*; 7:00 pm | | Mount St. Mary's | L 53–66 | 0–13 | Physical Education Complex (725); Baltimore, MD |
| Dec 27, 2017*; 7:30 pm, ACCN | | at Georgia Tech | L 62–76 | 0–14 | McCamish Pavilion (5,341); Atlanta, GA |
| Dec 30, 2017*; 2:00 pm, BTN+ | | at Penn State | L 43–88 | 0–15 | Bryce Jordan Center (4,512); University Park, PA |
MEAC regular season
| Jan 3, 2018; 8:00 pm | | at Norfolk State | L 67–75 | 0–16 (0–1) | Joseph G. Echols Memorial Hall (314); Norfolk, VA |
| Jan 6, 2018; 4:00 pm | | Savannah State | L 71–80 | 0–17 (0–2) | Physical Education Complex (624); Baltimore, MD |
| Jan 8, 2018; 7:30 pm | | Florida A&M | W 79–78 ^{2OT} | 1–17 (1–2) | Physical Education Complex (327); Baltimore, MD |
| Jan 13, 2018; 4:00 pm | | at North Carolina Central | L 61–81 | 1–18 (1–3) | McDougald–McLendon Gymnasium (1,889); Durham, NC |
| Jan 15, 2018; 7:30 pm | | at North Carolina A&T | L 47–60 | 1–19 (1–4) | Corbett Sports Center (2,849); Greensboro, NC |
| Jan 20, 2018; 4:00 pm | | Morgan State | W 80–73 | 2–19 (2–4) | Physical Education Complex (2,100); Baltimore, MD |
| Jan 27, 2018; 7:30 pm | | South Carolina State | W 73–65 | 3–19 (3–4) | Physical Education Complex (1,100); Baltimore, MD |
| Jan 29, 2018; 7:30 pm | | Maryland Eastern Shore | W 71–68 | 4–19 (4–4) | Physical Education Complex (989); Baltimore, MD |
| Jan 31, 2018; 7:00 pm | | at Hampton | L 59–70 ^{OT} | 4–20 (4–5) | Hampton Convocation Center (4,515); Hampton, VA |
| Feb 3, 2018; 4:00 pm | | at Bethune–Cookman | L 60–80 | 4–21 (4–6) | Moore Gymnasium (814); Daytona Beach, FL |
| Feb 5, 2018; 7:30 pm | | at South Carolina State | W 84–60 | 5–21 (5–6) | SHM Memorial Center; Orangeburg, SC |
| Feb 12, 2018; 7:30 pm | | Hampton | L 79–82 | 5–22 (5–7) | Physical Education Complex (898); Baltimore, MD |
| Feb 17, 2018; 4:00 pm | | Bethune–Cookman | L 85–89 | 5–23 (5–8) | Physical Education Complex (2,230); Baltimore, MD |
| Feb 19, 2018; 7:30 pm | | at Delaware State | L 51–69 | 5–24 (5–9) | Memorial Hall (874); Dover, DE |
| Feb 26, 2018; 8:00 pm | | at Morgan State | L 56–69 | 5–25 (5–10) | Talmadge L. Hill Field House (4,246); Baltimore, MD |
| Mar 1, 2018; 7:30 pm | | Howard | L 71–78 | 5–26 (5–11) | Physical Education Complex (1,011); Baltimore, MD |
MEAC tournament
| Mar 6, 2018; 6:30 pm, ESPN3 | (11) | vs. (6) North Carolina Central; First round | L 48–60 | 5–27 | Norfolk Scope; Norfolk, VA |
*Non-conference game. ^{#}Rankings from AP Poll. (#) Tournament seedings in parentheses. All times are in Eastern Time.
