= 2018 MEAC men's basketball tournament =

- Classification: Division I
- Season: 2017–18
- Teams: 13
- Site: Norfolk Scope; Norfolk, Virginia
- Champions: North Carolina Central (3rd title)
- Winning coach: LeVelle Moton (3rd title)
- MVP: Pablo Rivas (North Carolina Central)
- Television: ESPN2 [Championship], ESPN3

2017–18 MEAC men's basketball standings
| | Conf. | | | | Overall |
| Team | W | | L | PCT | W | | L | PCT |
|---|---|---|---|---|---|---|---|---|
| Hampton | 12 | – | 4 | .750 | 19 | – | 16 | .543 |
| Bethune–Cookman | 12 | – | 4 | .750 | 18 | – | 14 | .563 |
| Savannah State | 12 | – | 4 | .750 | 15 | – | 17 | .469 |
| North Carolina A&T | 11 | – | 5 | .688 | 20 | – | 15 | .571 |
| Norfolk State | 11 | – | 5 | .688 | 14 | – | 19 | .424 |
| North Carolina Central † | 9 | – | 7 | .563 | 19 | – | 16 | .543 |
| Morgan State | 7 | – | 9 | .438 | 13 | – | 19 | .406 |
| Howard | 7 | – | 9 | .438 | 10 | – | 23 | .303 |
| Florida A&M | 7 | – | 9 | .438 | 9 | – | 25 | .265 |
| South Carolina State | 6 | – | 10 | .375 | 10 | – | 22 | .313 |
| Coppin State | 5 | – | 11 | .313 | 5 | – | 27 | .156 |
| Maryland Eastern Shore | 3 | – | 13 | .188 | 7 | – | 25 | .219 |
| Delaware State | 2 | – | 14 | .125 | 4 | – | 28 | .125 |
† 2018 MEAC tournament winner

The 2018 Mid-Eastern Athletic Conference men's basketball tournament was the postseason men's basketball tournament for the Mid-Eastern Athletic Conference. The tournament was held from March 5–10, 2018 at the Norfolk Scope in Norfolk, Virginia. No. 6 seed North Carolina Central defeated No. 1 seed Hampton in the championship game to win the tournament and receive the conference's automatic bid to the NCAA tournament.

== Seeds ==
Teams were seeded by record within the conference, with a tiebreaker system to seed teams with identical conference records. The top three teams received a first round bye.

| Seed | School | Conference | Tiebreaker |
|---|---|---|---|
| 1 | Hampton | 12–4 | 2–1 vs. Sav, BCU |
| 2 | Bethune–Cookman | 12–4 | 1–1 vs. Hampton, Sav |
| 3 | Savannah State | 12–4 | 1–2 vs. Hampton, BCU |
| 4 | North Carolina A&T | 11–5 | 1–0 vs. Norfolk |
| 5 | Norfolk State | 11–5 | 0–1 vs. NC A&T |
| 6 | NC Central | 9–7 | |
| 7 | Morgan State | 7–9 | 3–0 vs. Howard, FAMU |
| 8 | Howard | 7–9 | 1–2 vs. Morgan, FAMU |
| 9 | Florida A&M | 7–9 | 1–3 vs. Howard, Morgan |
| 10 | SC State | 6–10 | |
| 11 | Coppin State | 5–11 | |
| 12 | Maryland Eastern Shore | 3–13 | |
| 13 | Delaware State | 2–14 | |

== Schedule ==
| Session | Game | Time | Matchup | Score | Television |
First round – Monday, March 5
| 1 | 1 | 6:30 pm | No. 4 North Carolina A&T vs. No. 13 Delaware State | 62–61^{OT} | ESPN3 |
| 1 | 2 | 9:00 pm | No. 5 Norfolk State vs. No. 12 Maryland Eastern Shore | 78–68 | ESPN3 |
First round – Tuesday, March 6
| 2 | 3 | 4:00 pm | No. 8 Howard vs. No. 9 Florida A&M | 78–88 | ESPN3 |
| 2 | 4 | 6:30 pm | No. 6 North Carolina Central vs. No. 11 Coppin State | 60–48 | ESPN3 |
| 2 | 5 | 9:00 pm | No. 7 Morgan State vs. No. 10 South Carolina State | 83–80 | ESPN3 |
Quarterfinals – Wednesday, March 7
| 3 | 6 | 6:00 pm | No. 1 Hampton vs. No. 9 Florida A&M | 75–71 | ESPN3 |
| 3 | 7 | 8:00 pm | No. 2 Bethune–Cookman vs. No. 7 Morgan State | 77–78 | ESPN3 |
Quarterfinals – Thursday, March 8
| 4 | 8 | 6:00 pm | No. 3 Savannah State vs. No. 6 North Carolina Central | 56–58 | ESPN3 |
| 4 | 9 | 8:00 pm | No. 4 North Carolina A&T vs. No. 5 Norfolk State | 70–64 | ESPN3 |
Semifinals – Friday, March 9
| 5 | 10 | 6:00 pm | No. 1 Hampton vs. No. 4 North Carolina A&T | 96–86 | ESPN3 |
| 5 | 11 | 8:00 pm | No. 7 Morgan State vs. No. 6 North Carolina Central | 70–79 | ESPN3 |
Championship – Saturday, March 10
| 6 | 12 | 1:00pm | No. 1 Hampton vs. No. 6 North Carolina Central | 63–71 | ESPN2 |
Game times in EST. Rankings denote tournament seeding.

== Bracket ==
First round March 5 and 6 ESPN3
8 | Howard | 78
9 | Florida A&M | 88
4 | North Carolina A&T | 62*
13 | Delaware State | 61
5 | Norfolk State | 78
12 | Maryland Eastern Shore | 68
7 | Morgan State | 83
10 | South Carolina State | 80
6 | NC Central | 60
11 | Coppin State | 48

Quarterfinals; March 7 and 8 ESPN3
1 | Hampton | 75
9 | Florida A&M | 71
4 | North Carolina A&T | 70
5 | Norfolk State | 64
2 | Bethune–Cookman | 77
7 | Morgan State | 78
3 | Savannah State | 56
6 | NC Central | 58

Semifinals; March 9 ESPN3
1 | Hampton | 96
4 | North Carolina A&T | 86
7 | Morgan State | 70
6 | NC Central | 79

Championship; March 10; ESPN2
1 | Hampton | 63
6 | NC Central | 71

* denotes overtime period
