= 2017–18 North Carolina Central Eagles men's basketball team =

American college basketball season

2017–18 North Carolina Central Eagles men's basketball

MEAC tournament champions

NCAA tournament, First Four
- Conference: Mid-Eastern Athletic Conference
- Record: 19–16 (9–7 MEAC)
- Head coach: LeVelle Moton (9th season)
- Assistant coaches: Luke D'Alessio; Reggie Sharp; Eric Wilson
- Home arena: McDougald–McLendon Gymnasium

2017–18 MEAC men's basketball standings
	Conf.				Overall
Team	W		L	PCT	W		L	PCT
Hampton	12	–	4	.750	19	–	16	.543
Bethune–Cookman	12	–	4	.750	18	–	14	.563
Savannah State	12	–	4	.750	15	–	17	.469
North Carolina A&T	11	–	5	.688	20	–	15	.571
Norfolk State	11	–	5	.688	14	–	19	.424
North Carolina Central †	9	–	7	.563	19	–	16	.543
Morgan State	7	–	9	.438	13	–	19	.406
Howard	7	–	9	.438	10	–	23	.303
Florida A&M	7	–	9	.438	9	–	25	.265
South Carolina State	6	–	10	.375	10	–	22	.313
Coppin State	5	–	11	.313	5	–	27	.156
Maryland Eastern Shore	3	–	13	.188	7	–	25	.219
Delaware State	2	–	14	.125	4	–	28	.125
† 2018 MEAC tournament winner

The 2017–18 North Carolina Central Eagles men's basketball team represented North Carolina Central University during the 2017–18 NCAA Division I men's basketball season. The Eagles, led by ninth-year head coach LeVelle Moton, played their home games at McDougald–McLendon Gymnasium in Durham, North Carolina as members of the Mid-Eastern Athletic Conference. They finished the season 19–16, 9–7 in MEAC play to finish sixth place. In the MEAC tournament, they defeated Coppin State, Savannah State, and Morgan State to advance to the championship game against Hampton. There they defeated the Pirates to receive the conference's automatic bid to the NCAA tournament for the second consecutive year. As a No. 16 seed, they lost in the First Four to Texas Southern.

== Previous season ==
The Eagles finished the 2016–17 season 25–9, 13–2 in MEAC play to win the MEAC regular season championship. In the MEAC tournament, they defeated Bethune–Cookman, Maryland Eastern Shore, and Norfolk State to win the tournament championship. As a result, they earned the conference's automatic bid to the NCAA tournament. As a No. 16 seed, they lost in the First Four to fellow No. 16 seed UC Davis.

== Roster ==
2017–18 North Carolina Central Eagles men's basketball team
Players
Coaches

Pos.	#	Name	Height	Weight	Year	Previous school	Hometown
G/F	0	Larry McKnight, Jr.	6 ft 4 in (1.93 m)	230 lb (104 kg)	RS Jr	Palm Beach State College	North Miami, Florida
PG	1	C.J. Wiggins	6 ft 0 in (1.83 m)	185 lb (84 kg)	Jr	Benedictine College Prep	Richmond, Virginia
F	2	Zacarry Douglas	6 ft 8 in (2.03 m)	215 lb (98 kg)	Jr	Cal State Northridge	Landover, Maryland
G/F	3	Brandon Goldsmith	6 ft 5 in (1.96 m)	195 lb (88 kg)	Jr	Walters State CC	Raleigh, North Carolina
PG	4	Jordan Perkins	6 ft 1 in (1.85 m)	190 lb (86 kg)	Fr	Greensboro Day School	Greensboro, North Carolina
G/F	5	Regigie Gardner, Jr.	6 ft 3 in (1.91 m)	180 lb (82 kg)	Fr	Loomis Chaffee School	Bowie, Maryland
G	10	Rashann Rashann	6 ft 2 in (1.88 m)	200 lb (91 kg)	RS Jr	Drexel	Philadelphia, Pennsylvania
PG	11	Alston Jones	6 ft 0 in (1.83 m)	185 lb (84 kg)	Jr	Daytona State College	Kansas City, Missouri
G/F	12	Alex Mills	6 ft 1 in (1.85 m)	185 lb (84 kg)	RS Jr	McLennan CC	Laurens, South Carolina
F	13	Pablo Rivas	6 ft 6 in (1.98 m)	210 lb (95 kg)	Sr	Sheridan College	Colón, Panama
PG	14	Raekwon Harney	5 ft 10 in (1.78 m)	170 lb (77 kg)	RS Sr	Louisburg College	Winston-Salem, North Carolina
F	21	Marius McAllister	6 ft 5 in (1.96 m)	205 lb (93 kg)	RS Sr	Hillside New Tech	Durham, North Carolina
F/C	22	Dominique Reid	6 ft 8 in (2.03 m)	235 lb (107 kg)	Sr	Niagara	Sicklerville, New Jersey
C	32	Raasean Davis	6 ft 9 in (2.06 m)	240 lb (109 kg)	RS Jr	Kent State	Chicago, Illinois
G/F	55	John Guerra	6 ft 2 in (1.88 m)	205 lb (93 kg)	Jr	Navy	Cary, North Carolina

Head coach

- LeVelle Moton (North Carolina Central)

Assistant coach(es)

- Luke D'Alessio (Catholic)
- Reggie Sharp (Auburn)
- Eric Wilson (Western Carolina)

Legend

- (C) Team captain
- (S) Suspended
- (I) Ineligible
- (W) Walk-on
- Injured
- Current redshirt

Roster
Last update: January 19, 2018

== Schedule and results ==
Date time, TV	Rank^{#}	Opponent^{#}	Result	Record	Site (attendance) city, state
Non-conference regular season
Nov 10, 2017*; 8:00 pm, ESPN3		at UIC	L 55–65	0–1	UIC Pavilion (2,788); Chicago, IL
Nov 13, 2017*; 12:00 pm, ESPN3		at Evansville	L 55–68	0–2	Ford Center (6,048); Evansville, IN
Nov 15, 2017*; 8:00 pm		at UT Martin; Global Sports Invitational	L 57–74	0–3	Skyhawk Arena (1,274); Martin, TN
Nov 17, 2017*; 7:00 pm		Warren Wilson	W 101–76	1–3	McDougald–McLendon Gymnasium (648); Durham, NC
Nov 19, 2017*; 4:00 pm		Southern; Global Sports Invitational	W 80–67	2–3	McDougald–McLendon Gymnasium (803); Durham, NC
Nov 22, 2017*; 8:00 pm		at Marshall; Global Sports Invitational	L 84–92	2–4	Cam Henderson Center (4,572); Huntington, WV
Nov 24, 2017*; 8:00 pm, BTN+		at Illinois; Global Sports Invitational	L 73–86	2–5	State Farm Center (11,004); Champaign, IL
Nov 26, 2017*; 3:00 pm		at Southeast Missouri State	W 77–70	3–5	Show Me Center (645); Cape Girardeau, MO
Nov 30, 2017*; 7:00 pm		Christendom	W 116–38	4–5	McDougald–McLendon Gymnasium (826); Durham, NC
Dec 2, 2017*; 7:00 pm		Southeast Missouri State	L 77–86	4–6	McDougald–McLendon Gymnasium (873); Durham, NC
Dec 9, 2017*; 4:00 pm		at George Mason	L 65–77	4–7	EagleBank Arena (3,489); Fairfax, VA
Dec 11, 2017*; 9:00 pm		at Grand Canyon	L 59–64	4–8	GCU Arena (6,276); Phoenix, AZ
Dec 14, 2017*; 7:00 pm		McNeese State	W 77–71	5–8	McDougald–McLendon Gymnasium (377); Durham, NC
Dec 30, 2017*; 2:00 pm		St. Andrews	W 75–55	6–8	McDougald–McLendon Gymnasium (431); Durham, NC
MEAC regular season
Jan 3, 2018; 7:30 pm		at Delaware State	W 65–62	7–8 (1–0)	Memorial Hall (249); Dover, DE
Jan 8, 2018; 7:30 pm		Norfolk State	W 64–63	8–8 (2–0)	McDougald–McLendon Gymnasium (1,386); Durham, NC
Jan 13, 2018; 4:00 pm		Coppin State	W 81–61	9–8 (3–0)	McDougald–McLendon Gymnasium (1,889); Durham, NC
Jan 15, 2018; 4:00 pm		Morgan State	W 77–63	10–8 (4–0)	McDougald–McLendon Gymnasium (1,377); Durham, NC
Jan 20, 2018; 4:00 pm, UStream		at Howard	L 78–84 ^{OT}	10–9 (4–1)	Charles E. Smith Center (852); Washington, D.C.
Jan 22, 2018; 7:30 pm		at Maryland Eastern Shore	W 63–60	11–9 (5–1)	Hytche Athletic Center (979); Princess Anne, MD
Jan 27, 2018; 4:00 pm		at North Carolina A&T	L 64–70	11–10 (5–2)	Corbett Sports Center (5,700); Greensboro, NC
Feb 3, 2018; 4:00 pm		Delaware State	W 72–61	12–10 (6–2)	McDougald–McLendon Gymnasium (1,623); Durham, NC
Feb 5, 2018; 7:00 pm		Hampton	L 70–86	12–11 (6–3)	McDougald–McLendon Gymnasium (1,474); Durham, NC
Feb 10, 2018; 6:00 pm		at Florida A&M	L 56–65	12–12 (6–4)	Lawson Center (1,879); Tallahassee, FL
Feb 12, 2018; 7:30 pm		at Bethune–Cookman	L 81–99	12–13 (6–5)	Moore Gymnasium (876); Daytona Beach, FL
Feb 17, 2018; 4:00 pm		Maryland Eastern Shore	W 77–49	13–13 (7–5)	McDougald–McLendon Gymnasium (1,322); Durham, NC
Feb 19, 2018; 7:00 pm		Howard	W 83–66	14–13 (8–5)	McDougald–McLendon Gymnasium (1,622); Durham, NC
Feb 24, 2018; 4:00 pm		at South Carolina State	L 79–102	14–14 (8–6)	SHM Memorial Center (655); Orangeburg, SC
Feb 26, 2018; 8:00 pm		at Savannah State	L 75–85	14–15 (8–7)	Tiger Arena (1,990); Savannah, GA
Mar 1, 2018; 7:30 pm		North Carolina A&T	W 70–59	15–15 (9–7)	McDougald–McLendon Gymnasium (3,036); Durham, NC
MEAC tournament
Mar 6, 2018; 6:30 pm, ESPN3	(6)	vs. (11) Coppin State; First round	W 60–48	16–15	Norfolk Scope; Norfolk, VA
Mar 8, 2018; 6:00 pm, ESPN3	(6)	vs. (3) Savannah State; Quarterfinals	W 58–56	17–15	Norfolk Scope; Norfolk, VA
Mar 9, 2018; 8:00 pm, ESPN3	(6)	vs. (7) Morgan State; Semifinals	W 79–70	18–15	Norfolk Scope (9,002); Norfolk, VA
Mar 10, 2018; 1:00 pm, ESPN2	(6)	vs. (1) Hampton; Championship	W 71–63	19–15	Norfolk Scope (6,036); Norfolk, VA
NCAA tournament
Mar 14, 2018*; 6:40 pm, truTV	(16 W)	vs. (16 W) Texas Southern; First Four	L 46–64	19–16	UD Arena (12,732); Dayton, OH
*Non-conference game. ^{#}Rankings from AP Poll. (#) Tournament seedings in parentheses. W=West. All times are in Eastern Time.
