= 2017–18 Norfolk State Spartans men's basketball team =

American college basketball season

2017–18 Norfolk State Spartans men's basketball
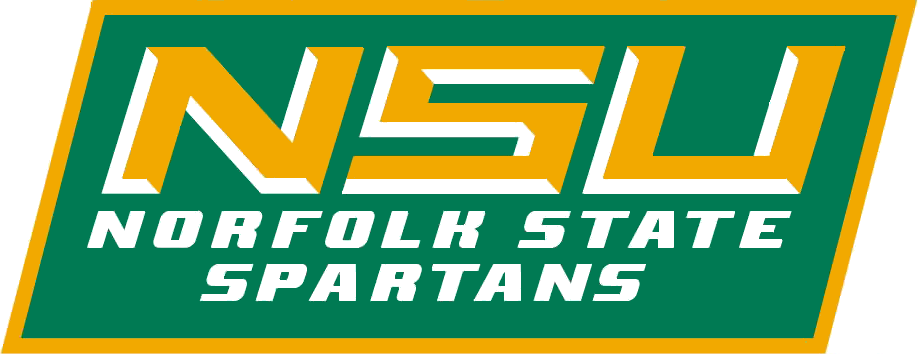
- Conference: Mid-Eastern Athletic Conference
- Record: 14–19 (11–5 MEAC)
- Head coach: Robert Jones (5th season)
- Assistant coaches: Kevin Jones; C.J. Clemons; Jamal Brown
- Home arena: Joseph G. Echols Memorial Hall

2017–18 MEAC men's basketball standings
	Conf.				Overall
Team	W		L	PCT	W		L	PCT
Hampton	12	–	4	.750	19	–	16	.543
Bethune–Cookman	12	–	4	.750	18	–	14	.563
Savannah State	12	–	4	.750	15	–	17	.469
North Carolina A&T	11	–	5	.688	20	–	15	.571
Norfolk State	11	–	5	.688	14	–	19	.424
North Carolina Central †	9	–	7	.563	19	–	16	.543
Morgan State	7	–	9	.438	13	–	19	.406
Howard	7	–	9	.438	10	–	23	.303
Florida A&M	7	–	9	.438	9	–	25	.265
South Carolina State	6	–	10	.375	10	–	22	.313
Coppin State	5	–	11	.313	5	–	27	.156
Maryland Eastern Shore	3	–	13	.188	7	–	25	.219
Delaware State	2	–	14	.125	4	–	28	.125
† 2018 MEAC tournament winner

The 2017–18 Norfolk State Spartans men's basketball team represented Norfolk State University during the 2017–18 NCAA Division I men's basketball season. The Spartans, led by fifth-year coach Robert Jones, played their home games at the Joseph G. Echols Memorial Hall in Norfolk, Virginia as members of the Mid-Eastern Athletic Conference. They finished the season 14–19, 11–5 in MEAC play to finish in a tie for fourth place. As the No. 5 seed in the MEAC tournament, they defeated Maryland Eastern Shore before losing to North Carolina A&T in the quarterfinals.

== Previous season ==
The Spartans finished the 2016–17 season 17–17, 12–4 in MEAC play to finish in second place. They defeated South Carolina State and Howard to advance to the Championship game of the MEAC tournament where they lost to North Carolina Central. They were invited to the CollegeInsider.com Tournament where they lost in the first round to Liberty.

== Roster ==
2017–18 Norfolk State Spartans men's basketball team
Players
Coaches

Pos.	#	Name	Height	Weight	Year	Hometown
G	0	Mastadi Pitt	6 ft 1 in (1.85 m)	205 lb (93 kg)	RS Fr	Hampton, Virginia
G/F	1	Preston Bungei	6 ft 6 in (1.98 m)	200 lb (91 kg)	RS Sr	Albuquerque, New Mexico
G	2	Zaynah Robinson	5 ft 11 in (1.8 m)	180 lb (82 kg)	Sr	Atlanta, Georgia
C	5	Bryan Gellineau	6 ft 11 in (2.11 m)	245 lb (111 kg)	RS Sr	Amityville, New York
G/F	13	Stavian Allen	6 ft 7 in (2.01 m)	210 lb (95 kg)	Sr	Cary, North Carolina
G	14	Nic Thomas	6 ft 2 in (1.88 m)	185 lb (84 kg)	RS So	Arlington, Texas
F	22	Alex Long	6 ft 8 in (2.03 m)	220 lb (100 kg)	Jr	Clinton, Maryland
G	24	Kyle Williams	6 ft 4 in (1.93 m)	185 lb (84 kg)	RS Sr	Bronx, New York
G	34	Steven Whitley	6 ft 3 in (1.91 m)	210 lb (95 kg)	RS So	Norfolk, Virginia
G	35	Derrik Jamerson, Jr.	6 ft 5 in (1.96 m)	190 lb (86 kg)	RS Jr	Detroit, Michigan
C	44	Dan Robinson	7 ft 0 in (2.13 m)	220 lb (100 kg)	RS Sr	Norfolk, Virginia
G	55	Kyonze Chavis	6 ft 4 in (1.93 m)	180 lb (82 kg)	So	Chesapeake, Virginia

Head coach

- Robert Jones (SUNY New Paltz)

Assistant coach(es)

- Kevin Jones (Bowie State)
- C.J. Clemons (Norfolk State)
- Jamal Brown (South Carolina State)

Legend

- (C) Team captain
- (S) Suspended
- (I) Ineligible
- (W) Walk-on
- Injured
- Current redshirt

Roster
Last update: January 11, 2018

== Schedule and results ==
Date time, TV	Rank^{#}	Opponent^{#}	Result	Record	Site city, state
Exhibition
Nov 4, 2017*; 7:00 pm		Virginia State	L 67–72 ^{OT}		Joseph G. Echols Memorial Hall (2,098); Norfolk, VA
Regular season
Nov 10, 2017*; 8:00 pm, SECN+		at Auburn	L 74–102	0–1	Auburn Arena (7,419); Auburn, AL
Nov 13, 2017*; 7:00 pm		Lynchburg	L 80–83	0–2	Joseph G. Echols Memorial Hall (1,986); Norfolk, VA
Nov 18, 2017*; 10:00 pm, FSSD		at San Diego; Grand Canyon Classic	L 62–71	0–3	Jenny Craig Pavilion (1,109); San Diego, CA
Nov 20, 2017*; 9:00 pm, ESPN3		at Grand Canyon; Grand Canyon Classic	L 60–85	0–4	GCU Arena (6,889); Phoenix, AZ
Nov 24, 2017*; 6:00 pm, ESPN3		vs. Robert Morris; Grand Canyon Classic	L 53–75	0–5	Jack Stephens Center (218); Little Rock, AR
Nov 26, 2017*; 4:00 pm		at Little Rock; Grand Canyon Classic	L 55–70	0–6	Jack Stephens Center (1,068); Little Rock, AR
Nov 29, 2017*; 8:15 pm		Kent State	L 70–79	0–7	Joseph G. Echols Memorial Hall (1,825); Norfolk, VA
Dec 2, 2017*; 6:00 pm		Bowling Green	L 77–92	0–8	Joseph G. Echols Memorial Hall (1,378); Norfolk, VA
Dec 9, 2017*; 4:00 pm, ESPN3		at Loyola–Chicago	L 52–80	0–9	Joseph J. Gentile Arena (1,904); Chicago, IL
Dec 14, 2017*; 7:00 pm		Mid-Atlantic Christian	W 112–34	1–9	Joseph G. Echols Memorial Hall (284); Norfolk, VA
Dec 16, 2017*; 4:00 pm		Niagara	L 82–85	1–10	Joseph G. Echols Memorial Hall (381); Norfolk, VA
Dec 18, 2017*; 8:00 pm		at Eastern Kentucky	L 66–83	1–11	McBrayer Arena (1,210); Richmond, KY
Dec 22, 2017*; 7:00 pm		vs. Old Dominion; Scope Series	L 50–61	1–12	Norfolk Scope (6,711); Norfolk, VA
Dec 30, 2017*; 7:00 pm, ESPN3		at Stony Brook	W 74–68	2–12	Island Federal Credit Union Arena (2,912); Stony Brook, NY
Jan 3, 2018; 8:00 pm		Coppin State	W 75–67	3–12 (1–0)	Joseph G. Echols Memorial Hall (314); Norfolk, VA
Jan 6, 2018; 4:00 pm		at North Carolina A&T; Postponed to Jan 17 (winter weather)			Corbett Sports Center; Greensboro, NC
Jan 8, 2018; 7:30 pm		at North Carolina Central	L 63–64	3–13 (1–1)	McDougald–McLendon Gymnasium (1,386); Durham, NC
Jan 15, 2018*; 7:00 pm		Elizabeth City State	L 67–76	3–14	Joseph G. Echols Memorial Hall (2,112); Norfolk, VA
Jan 17, 2018; 8:00 pm		at North Carolina A&T; Postponed to Jan 18 (winter weather)			Corbett Sports Center; Greensboro, NC
Jan 18, 2018; 2:00 pm, Lock TV		at North Carolina A&T	L 68–71	3–15 (1–2)	Corbett Sports Center (1,437); Greensboro, NC
Jan 20, 2018; 4:00 pm		at South Carolina State	W 78–54	4–15 (2–2)	SHM Memorial Center (357); Orangeburg, SC
Jan 22, 2018; 8:00 pm		at Savannah State	L 99–104	4–16 (2–3)	Tiger Arena (1,198); Savannah, GA
Jan 27, 2018; 6:30 pm		Bethune–Cookman	W 71–70	5–16 (3–3)	Joseph G. Echols Memorial Hall (2,327); Norfolk, VA
Jan 29, 2018; 8:00 pm		Florida A&M	W 80–71	6–16 (4–3)	Joseph G. Echols Memorial Hall (1,319); Norfolk, VA
Feb 3, 2018; 6:30 pm		Morgan State	W 76–65	7–16 (5–3)	Joseph G. Echols Memorial Hall (2,603); Norfolk, VA
Feb 5, 2018; 7:30 pm		at Bethune–Cookman	W 83–79	8–16 (6–3)	Moore Gymnasium (809); Daytona Beach, FL
Feb 10, 2018; 6:00 pm		at Hampton	L 52–82	8–17 (6–4)	Hampton Convocation Center (7,213); Hampton, VA
Feb 12, 2018; 7:00 pm		Delaware State	W 93–58	9–17 (7–4)	Joseph G. Echols Memorial Hall (1,736); Norfolk, VA
Feb 17, 2018; 6:30 pm		Savannah State	W 85–77	10–17 (8–4)	Joseph G. Echols Memorial Hall (1,726); Norfolk, VA
Feb 19, 2018; 8:00 pm		South Carolina State	W 76–62	11–17 (9–4)	Joseph G. Echols Memorial Hall (1,343); Norfolk, VA
Feb 24, 2018; 4:00 pm		at Maryland Eastern Shore	W 74–63	12–17 (10–4)	Hytche Athletic Center (4,671); Princess Anne, MD
Feb 26, 2018; 7:00 pm, ESPNU		at Howard	W 79–74	13–17 (11–4)	Burr Gymnasium (2,035); Washington, D.C.
Mar 1, 2018; 8:00 pm		Hampton	L 71–74	13–18 (11–5)	Joseph G. Echols Memorial Hall (4,500); Norfolk, VA
MEAC tournament
Mar 5, 2018; 9:00 pm	(5)	vs. (12) Maryland Eastern Shore; First round	W 78–68	14–18	Norfolk Scope (4,021); Norfolk, VA
Mar 8, 2018; 8:00 pm	(5)	vs. (4) North Carolina A&T; Quarterfinals	L 64–70	14–19	Norfolk Scope; Norfolk, VA
*Non-conference game. ^{#}Rankings from AP Poll. (#) Tournament seedings in parentheses. All times are in Eastern Time.
