= 2017–18 Savannah State Tigers basketball team =

American college basketball season

2017–18 Savannah State Tigers basketball
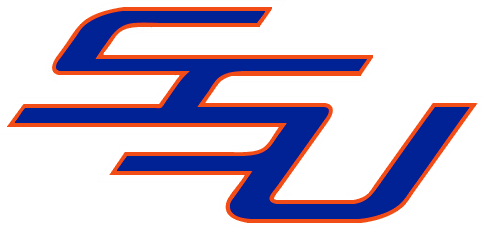

MEAC regular-season co-champions
- Conference: Mid-Eastern Athletic Conference
- Record: 5–17, 10 wins vacated (2–4 MEAC, 10 wins vacated)
- Head coach: Horace Broadnax (13th season)
- Assistant coaches: Clyde Wormley; Timothy "Pat" Hardy; Joseph Flegler
- Home arena: Tiger Arena

2017–18 MEAC men's basketball standings
	Conf.				Overall
Team	W		L	PCT	W		L	PCT
Hampton	12	–	4	.750	19	–	16	.543
Bethune–Cookman	12	–	4	.750	18	–	14	.563
Savannah State	12	–	4	.750	15	–	17	.469
North Carolina A&T	11	–	5	.688	20	–	15	.571
Norfolk State	11	–	5	.688	14	–	19	.424
North Carolina Central †	9	–	7	.563	19	–	16	.543
Morgan State	7	–	9	.438	13	–	19	.406
Howard	7	–	9	.438	10	–	23	.303
Florida A&M	7	–	9	.438	9	–	25	.265
South Carolina State	6	–	10	.375	10	–	22	.313
Coppin State	5	–	11	.313	5	–	27	.156
Maryland Eastern Shore	3	–	13	.188	7	–	25	.219
Delaware State	2	–	14	.125	4	–	28	.125
† 2018 MEAC tournament winner

The 2017–18 Savannah State Tigers basketball team represented Savannah State University during the 2017–18 NCAA Division I men's basketball season. The Tigers, led by 13th-year head coach Horace Broadnax, played their home games at Tiger Arena in Savannah, Georgia as members of the Mid-Eastern Athletic Conference (MEAC). With a win over South Carolina State on March 1, 2018, the Tigers earned a share of the MEAC regular-season championship. They finished the season 15–17, 12–4 in MEAC play, finishing in a three-way tie for first place. Due to tie-breaking procedures, the Tigers received the No. 3 seed in the MEAC tournament, where they lost to North Carolina Central in the quarterfinals.

The Tigers were initially ruled to be ineligible for postseason play for a second consecutive season due to APR violations. However, the NCAA granted the Tigers a waiver allowed them to participate in postseason play.

The season marked the second-last season for the Tigers in Division I as they rejoined Division II following the 2018–19 season.

In 2019, ten wins were vacated due to academic certification errors.

== Previous season ==
The Tigers finished the 2016–17 season 13–16, 10–6 in MEAC play, to finish in fifth place. The Tigers were ineligible for postseason play due to APR violations.

== Roster ==
2017–18 Savannah State Tigers men's basketball team
Players
Coaches

Pos.	#	Name	Height	Weight	Year	Hometown
G	1	Austin Dasent	6 ft 3 in (1.91 m)	190 lb (86 kg)	Sr	Charlotte, NC
F	2	Ralueke Orizu	6 ft 8 in (2.03 m)	180 lb (82 kg)	Fr	Austell, GA
G	3	Zach Sellers	6 ft 1 in (1.85 m)	175 lb (79 kg)	So	Cheraw, SC
F	4	John Jr. Grant	6 ft 6 in (1.98 m)	208 lb (94 kg)	Jr	Baltimore, MD
F	5	Jarvaris Jenkins	6 ft 6 in (1.98 m)	205 lb (93 kg)	Sr	Deerfield Beach, FL
C	10	Maricus Glenn	6 ft 10 in (2.08 m)	235 lb (107 kg)	Sr	Greensboro, GA
F	12	Jahlin Smith	6 ft 7 in (2.01 m)	180 lb (82 kg)	Jr	Barnwell, SC
G	14	Alante Fenner	6 ft 5 in (1.96 m)	180 lb (82 kg)	Sr	Lake Wales, FL
G	15	Isaiah Felder	6 ft 0 in (1.83 m)	180 lb (82 kg)	Jr	Orangeburg, SC
G	22	Dexter McClanahan	6 ft 5 in (1.96 m)	180 lb (82 kg)	Jr	Stockbridge, GA
F	24	Juwan Grant	6 ft 6 in (1.98 m)	215 lb (98 kg)	Sr	Baltimore, MD
G/F	30	Jahir Cabeza	6 ft 5 in (1.96 m)	190 lb (86 kg)	Sr	Colón, Panama
G	32	Chris Dubose	6 ft 4 in (1.93 m)	185 lb (84 kg)	Fr	Stockbridge, GA
G	50	Khalen Pinkett	6 ft 1 in (1.85 m)	180 lb (82 kg)	Jr	Decatur, GA
G	55	Ty'lik Evans	5 ft 7 in (1.7 m)	175 lb (79 kg)	Jr	Macon, GA

Head coach

- Horace Broadnax (Georgetown)

Assistant coach(es)

- Clyde Wormley (The Citadel)
- Timothy "Pat" Hardy (Savannah State)
- Joseph Flegler (Savannah State)

Legend

- (C) Team captain
- (S) Suspended
- (I) Ineligible
- (W) Walk-on
- Injured
- Current redshirt

Roster
Last update: September 26, 2024

== Schedule and results ==
Date time, TV	Rank^{#}	Opponent^{#}	Result	Record	Site (attendance) city, state
Exhibition
November 3, 2017*; 8:00 p.m.		Paine College	W 105–91		Tiger Arena; Savannah, GA
November 3, 2017*; 8:00 p.m.		Fort Valley State	L 89–103		Tiger Arena (1,890); Savannah, GA
Non-conference regular season
November 10, 2017*; 12:00 p.m., FSOH/ESPN3		at No. 12 Cincinnati; Cayman Islands Classic Mainland	L 77–107	0–1	BB&T Arena (6,610); Highland Heights, KY
November 13, 2017*; 7:00 p.m.		East Tennessee State	L 61–76	0–2	Tiger Arena (965); Savannah, GA
November 15, 2017*; 5:00 p.m.		Middle Georgia State	W 114–80	1–2	Tiger Arena (1,002); Savannah, GA
November 17, 2017*; 4:00 p.m.		at Louisiana; Cayman Islands Classic Mainland	L 82–115	1–3	Cajundome (3,096); Lafayette, LA
November 20, 2017*; 4:00 p.m.		vs. Jacksonville State; Cayman Islands Classic Mainland	L 71–86	1–4	McKenzie Arena (2,332); Chattanooga, TN
November 21, 2017*; 5:00 p.m.		vs. Alabama State; Cayman Islands Classic Mainland	W 101–97	2–4	McKenzie Arena (2,211); Chattanooga, TN
November 25, 2017*; 2:00 p.m., FSSW+		at Texas Tech	L 69–103	2–5	United Supermarkets Arena (6,614); Lubbock, TX
November 28, 2017*; 7:00 p.m., Cox		at No. 8 Wichita State	L 66–112	2–6	Charles Koch Arena (10,506); Wichita, KS
November 30, 2017*; 7:00 p.m.		Carver College	W 98–60	3–6	Tiger Arena (950); Savannah, GA
December 2, 2017*; 4:00 p.m.		William & Mary	L 85–108	3–7	Tiger Arena (819); Savannah, GA
December 9, 2017*; 5:00 p.m.		at Georgia Southern	L 91–102	3–8	Hanner Fieldhouse (1,105); Statesboro, GA
December 13, 2017*; 7:00 p.m.		at No. 9 Texas A&M	L 66–113	3–9	Reed Arena (6,339); College Station, TX
December 17, 2017*; 2:00 p.m., FSSW		at No. 21 Baylor	L 86–118	3–10	Ferrell Center (6,996); Waco, TX
December 19, 2017*; 7:00 p.m., ACCN Extra		at No. 13 Virginia	L 47–78	3–11	John Paul Jones Arena (13,597); Charlottesville, VA
December 31, 2017*; 12:00 p.m., BTN		at No. 2 Michigan State	L 52–108	3–12	Breslin Center (14,797); East Lansing, MI
MEAC regular season
January 6, 2018; 4:00 p.m.		at Coppin State	W 80–71	4–12 (1–0)	Physical Education Complex (624); Baltimore, MD
January 8, 2018; 7:30 p.m.		at Morgan State	L 88–89	4–13 (1–1)	Talmadge L. Hill Field House (875); Baltimore, MD
January 13, 2018; 6:00 p.m.		Maryland Eastern Shore	W 87–59	5–13 (2–1)	Tiger Arena (2,136); Savannah, GA
January 15, 2018; 8:00 p.m.		Howard	W 91–90	6–13 (3–1)	Tiger Arena (2,033); Savannah, GA
January 20, 2018; 6:00 p.m.		Hampton	W 103–101	7–13 (4–1)	Tiger Arena (2,219); Savannah, GA
January 22, 2018; 8:00 p.m.		Norfolk State	W 104–99	8–13 (5–1)	Tiger Arena (1,998); Savannah, GA
January 27, 2018; 4:00 p.m.		at Delaware State	W 106–86	9–13 (6–1)	Memorial Hall (537); Dover, DE
January 31, 2018; 8:00 p.m.		at Florida A&M	W 107–100	10–13 (7–1)	Moore Gymnasium (2,479); Daytona Beach, FL
February 3, 2018; 6:00 p.m.		South Carolina State	W 111–99	11–13 (8–1)	Tiger Arena (2,375); Savannah, GA
February 10, 2018; 6:00 p.m.		Morgan State	W 97–94 ^{OT}	12–13 (9–1)	Tiger Arena (2,901); Savannah, GA
February 12, 2018; 8:00 p.m.		North Carolina A&T	W 108–106	13–13 (10–1)	Tiger Arena (3,002); Savannah, GA
February 17, 2018; 6:30 p.m.		at Norfolk State	L 77–85	13–14 (10–2)	Joseph G. Echols Memorial Hall (1,726); Norfolk, VA
February 19, 2018; 7:00 p.m.		at Hampton	L 102–114 ^{OT}	13–15 (10–3)	Hampton Convocation Center (4,511); Hampton, VA
February 24, 2018; 4:00 p.m.		at Bethune–Cookman	L 92–121	13–16 (10–4)	Moore Gymnasium (898); Daytona Beach, FL
February 26, 2018; 8:00 p.m.		North Carolina Central	W 85–75	14–16 (11–4)	Tiger Arena (1,990); Savannah, GA
March 1, 2018; 7:30 p.m.		at South Carolina State	W 94–81	15–16 (12–4)	SHM Memorial Center; Orangeburg, SC
MEAC tournament
March 8, 2018; 6:00 p.m., ESPN3	(3)	vs. (6) North Carolina Central; Quarterfinals	L 56–58	15–17	Norfolk Scope; Norfolk, VA
*Non-conference game. ^{#}Rankings from AP poll. (#) Tournament seedings in parentheses. All times are in Eastern.
