= 2017–18 Howard Bison men's basketball team =

American college basketball season

2017–18 Howard Bison men's basketball
- Conference: Mid-Eastern Athletic Conference
- Record: 10–23 (7–9 MEAC)
- Head coach: Kevin Nickelberry (8th season)
- Assistant coaches: Keith Coutreyer; Sean Whalen; Jordan Brooks
- Home arena: Burr Gymnasium

2017–18 MEAC men's basketball standings
	Conf.				Overall
Team	W		L	PCT	W		L	PCT
Hampton	12	–	4	.750	19	–	16	.543
Bethune–Cookman	12	–	4	.750	18	–	14	.563
Savannah State	12	–	4	.750	15	–	17	.469
North Carolina A&T	11	–	5	.688	20	–	15	.571
Norfolk State	11	–	5	.688	14	–	19	.424
North Carolina Central †	9	–	7	.563	19	–	16	.543
Morgan State	7	–	9	.438	13	–	19	.406
Howard	7	–	9	.438	10	–	23	.303
Florida A&M	7	–	9	.438	9	–	25	.265
South Carolina State	6	–	10	.375	10	–	22	.313
Coppin State	5	–	11	.313	5	–	27	.156
Maryland Eastern Shore	3	–	13	.188	7	–	25	.219
Delaware State	2	–	14	.125	4	–	28	.125
† 2018 MEAC tournament winner

The 2017–18 Howard Bison men's basketball team represented Howard University during the 2017–18 NCAA Division I men's basketball season. The Bison, led by eighth-year head coach Kevin Nickelberry, played their home games at Burr Gymnasium in Washington, D.C. as members of the Mid-Eastern Athletic Conference. They finished the season 10–23, 7–9 in MEAC play to finish in a three-way tie for seventh place. As the No. 8 seed in the MEAC tournament, they lost in the first round to Florida A&M.

== Previous season ==
The Bison finished the 2016–17 season 10–24, 5–11 in MEAC play to finish in a tie for 11th place. They defeated Coppin State and Morgan State in the MEAC tournament before losing in the semifinals to Norfolk State.

== Preseason ==
The Bison were picked to finish in eighth place in a preseason poll of league coaches. Senior G/F Charles Williams was named to the preseason All-MEAC first team.

== Roster ==
2017–18 Howard Bison men's basketball team
Players
Coaches

Pos.	#	Name	Height	Weight	Year	Hometown
G	00	Dalique Mingo	6 ft 2 in (1.88 m)	200 lb (91 kg)	Sr	Long Island, New York
G	1	Kai Tease	6 ft 2 in (1.88 m)	190 lb (86 kg)	RS Fr	Sacramento, California
G	2	R. J. Cole	6 ft 1 in (1.85 m)	175 lb (79 kg)	Fr	Union, New Jersey
G	3	Nate Garvey	6 ft 4 in (1.93 m)	225 lb (102 kg)	RS Fr	Nanuet, New York
F	5	Marcus Hall	6 ft 7 in (2.01 m)	220 lb (100 kg)	So	Atlanta, GA
F	10	Zion Cousins	6 ft 7 in (2.01 m)	185 lb (84 kg)	Fr	Upper Marlboro, Maryland
G	11	Kyle Foster	6 ft 5 in (1.96 m)	165 lb (75 kg)	Fr	Hampton, Virginia
G/F	13	Charles Williams	6 ft 4 in (1.93 m)	185 lb (84 kg)	So	Richmond, Virginia
G	21	Chad Lott	6 ft 4 in (1.93 m)	185 lb (84 kg)	Fr	Shreveport, Louisiana
F	22	Ibrahim Dosunmu	6 ft 7 in (2.01 m)	200 lb (91 kg)	So	Chicago, Illinois
F	23	Jalen Jones	6 ft 5 in (1.96 m)	200 lb (91 kg)	RS Jr	Kinston, North Carolina
G	24	Justin Cotten	6 ft 0 in (1.83 m)	180 lb (82 kg)	Jr	Clinton, Maryland
F/C	25	Cameron Lewis	6 ft 8 in (2.03 m)	220 lb (100 kg)	Jr	Buffalo, New York
F/C	34	Michael Obindu	6 ft 8 in (2.03 m)	230 lb (104 kg)	Jr	Ibusa Delta State, Nigeria
F/C	44	Henry Odunze	6 ft 8 in (2.03 m)	185 lb (84 kg)	RS Fr	Erwin, North Carolina

Head coach

- Kevin Nickelberry (Virginia Wesleyan)

Assistant coach(es)

- Keith Coutreyer
- Sean Whalen
- Jordan Brooks

Legend

- (C) Team captain
- (S) Suspended
- (I) Ineligible
- (W) Walk-on
- Injured
- Current redshirt

Roster
Last update: January 11, 2017

== Schedule and results ==
Date time, TV	Rank^{#}	Opponent^{#}	Result	Record	Site (attendance) city, state
Non-conference regular season
Nov 10, 2017*; 7:30 pm		at George Washington	L 75–84	0–1	Charles E. Smith Center (3,831); Washington, D.C.
Nov 12, 2017*; 8:00 pm, BTN		at Indiana; Hoosier Tip-Off Classic	L 77–86	0–2	Simon Skjodt Assembly Hall (17,222); Bloomington, IN
Nov 14, 2017*; 9:00 pm, RTNW		at No. 17 Gonzaga	L 69–106	0–3	McCarthey Athletic Center (6,000); Spokane, WA
Nov 18, 2017*; 2:00 pm, ESPN3		at Eastern Michigan; Indiana Tip—Off Classic	L 66–76	0–4	Convocation Center (819); Ypsilanti, MI
Nov 20, 2017*; 8:00 pm		at Arkansas State; Indiana Tip—Off Classic	L 78–92	0–5	ASU Convocation Center (2,478); Jonesboro, AR
Nov 22, 2017*; 7:00 pm, ESPN3		at South Florida; Indiana Tip—Off Classic	L 52–75	0–6	USF Sun Dome (2,080); Tampa, FL
Nov 27, 2017*; 7:00 pm, ESPN3		at Liberty	L 55–75	0–7	Vines Center (2,169); Lynchburg, VA
Nov 30, 2017*; 7:00 pm		Central Penn	W 81–64	1–7	Burr Gymnasium (400); Washington, D.C.
Dec 4, 2017*; 7:00 pm		Penn	L 68–81	1–8	Burr Gymnasium (425); Washington, D.C.
Dec 7, 2017*; 8:45 pm, FS1		at Georgetown	L 67–81	1–9	Capital One Arena (4,543); Washington, D.C.
Dec 9, 2017*; 4:00 pm, NBCSP/NBCSW		at American	L 63–74	1–10	Bender Arena (2,213); Washington, D.C.
Dec 14, 2017*; 6:00 pm		Washington Adventist	W 76–65	2–10	Burr Gymnasium (375); Washington, D.C.
Dec 18, 2017*; 8:00 pm		at Jacksonville State	L 60–62	2–11	Pete Mathews Coliseum (1,008); Jacksonville, FL
Dec 21, 2017*; 9:00 pm, 6,013		at UTEP; Sun Bowl Invitational semifinal	L 56–69	2–12	Don Haskins Center (6,013); El Paso, TX
Dec 22, 2017*; 7:00 pm		vs. UNC Wilmington; Sun Bowl Invitational 3rd place game	W 80–75	3–12	Don Haskins Center (8,021); El Paso, TX
Dec 29, 2017*; 1:00 am, Spectrum Sports		at Hawaii	L 59–84	3–13	Stan Sheriff Center (5,296); Honolulu, HI
MEAC regular season
Jan 3, 2018; 8:00 pm		at Florida A&M	L 76–84	3–14 (0–1)	Lawson Center (1,492); Tallahassee, FL
Jan 6, 2018; 4:00 pm		Bethune–Cookman	L 87–92 ^{OT}	3–15 (0–2)	Burr Gymnasium (478); Washington, D.C.
Jan 8, 2018; 7:30 pm		Hampton; Battle of the Real HU; Postponed to Feb 8 due to winter storm			Burr Gymnasium; Washington, D.C.
Jan 13, 2018; 4:00 pm		at South Carolina State	L 88–91 ^{OT}	3–16 (0–3)	SHM Memorial Center; Orangeburg, SC
Jan 15, 2018; 8:00 pm		at Savannah State	L 90–91	3–17 (0–4)	Tiger Arena (2,033); Savannah, GA
Jan 20, 2018; 4:00 pm		North Carolina Central	W 84–78 ^{OT}	4-17 (1–4)	Burr Gymnasium (852); Washington, D.C.
Jan 22, 2018; 7:30 pm		North Carolina A&T	W 90–88 ^{OT}	5–17 (2–4)	Burr Gymnasium (1,378); Washington, D.C.
Jan 27, 2018; 4:00 pm		at Maryland Eastern Shore	W 85–75	6–17 (3–4)	Hytche Athletic Center (1,622); Princess Anne, MD
Feb 3, 2018; 4:00 pm		Florida A&M	W 83–80 ^{OT}	7–17 (4–4)	Burr Gymnasium (2,152); Washington, D.C.
Feb 5, 2018; 5:30 pm		at Morgan State	L 61–97	7–18 (4–5)	Talmadge L. Hill Field House (3,156); Baltimore, MD
Feb 8, 2018; 7:30 pm		Hampton; Battle of the Real HU	L 81–95	7–19 (4–6)	Burr Gymnasium (2,500); Washington, D.C.
Feb 12, 2018; 7:30 pm		Maryland Eastern Shore	W 84–56	8–19 (5–6)	Burr Gymnasium (1,536); Washington, D.C.
Feb 17, 2018; 4:00 pm		at North Carolina A&T	L 69–83	8–20 (5–7)	Corbett Sports Center (3,526); Greensboro, NC
Feb 19, 2018; 7:00 pm, ESPNU		at North Carolina Central	L 66–83	8–21 (5–8)	McDougald–McLendon Gymnasium (1,622); Durham, NC
Feb 24, 2018; 4:00 pm		Delaware State	W 93–74	9–21 (6–8)	Burr Gymnasium; Washington, D.C.
Feb 26, 2018; 7:30 pm, ESPNU		Norfolk State	L 74–79	9–22 (6–9)	Burr Gymnasium (2,035); Washington, D.C.
Mar 1, 2018; 7:30 pm		at Coppin State	W 78–71	10–22 (7–9)	Physical Education Complex (1,011); Baltimore, MD
MEAC tournament
Mar 6, 2018; 4:00 pm	(8)	vs. (9) Florida A&M; First round	L 78–88	10–23	Norfolk Scope; Norfolk, VA
*Non-conference game. ^{#}Rankings from AP Poll. (#) Tournament seedings in parentheses. All times are in Eastern Time.

== Awards and honors ==
Name	Award	Date	Source
RJ Cole	MEAC Rookie of the Week	November 14, 2017	
RJ Cole	MEAC Rookie of the Week	December 5, 2017	
RJ Cole	MEAC Rookie of the Week	December 12, 2017	
Zion Cousins	MEAC Defensive Player of the Week	December 5, 2017	
Charles Williams	MEAC Player of the Week	December 5, 2017	
Charles Williams	MEAC Rookie of the Week	December 12, 2017 (honorable mention)	
