= 2017–18 North Carolina A&T Aggies men's basketball team =

American college basketball season

2017–18 North Carolina A&T Aggies men's basketball

CIT, First round
- Conference: Mid-Eastern Athletic Conference
- Record: 20–15 (11–5 MEAC)
- Head coach: Jay Joyner (2nd season)
- Assistant coaches: Jack Agostino; Willie Jones; David Butts
- Home arena: Corbett Sports Center

2017–18 MEAC men's basketball standings
	Conf.				Overall
Team	W		L	PCT	W		L	PCT
Hampton	12	–	4	.750	19	–	16	.543
Bethune–Cookman	12	–	4	.750	18	–	14	.563
Savannah State	12	–	4	.750	15	–	17	.469
North Carolina A&T	11	–	5	.688	20	–	15	.571
Norfolk State	11	–	5	.688	14	–	19	.424
North Carolina Central †	9	–	7	.563	19	–	16	.543
Morgan State	7	–	9	.438	13	–	19	.406
Howard	7	–	9	.438	10	–	23	.303
Florida A&M	7	–	9	.438	9	–	25	.265
South Carolina State	6	–	10	.375	10	–	22	.313
Coppin State	5	–	11	.313	5	–	27	.156
Maryland Eastern Shore	3	–	13	.188	7	–	25	.219
Delaware State	2	–	14	.125	4	–	28	.125
† 2018 MEAC tournament winner

The 2017–18 North Carolina A&T Aggies men's basketball team represented North Carolina Agricultural and Technical State University during the 2017–18 NCAA Division I men's basketball season. The Aggies, led by second-year head coach Jay Joyner, played their home games at the Corbett Sports Center in Greensboro, North Carolina as members of the Mid-Eastern Athletic Conference. They finished the season 20–15, 11–5 in MEAC play to finish in a tie for fourth place. They defeated Delaware State and Norfolk State to advance to the semifinals of the MEAC tournament where they lost to Hampton. They were invited to the CollegeInsider.com Tournament where they lost in the first round to Liberty.

== Previous season ==
The Aggies finished the 2015–16 season 3–29, 1–15 in MEAC play to finish in last place. They lost in the first round of the MEAC tournament to Maryland Eastern Shore.

== Roster ==
2017–18 North Carolina A&T Aggies men's basketball team
Players
Coaches

Pos.	#	Name	Height	Weight	Year	Previous school	Hometown
F	0	Davaris McGowens	6 ft 7 in (2.01 m)	230 lb (104 kg)	Sr	Gulf Coast State College	Taylors, South Carolina
G	1	Aaren Edmead	5 ft 10 in (1.78 m)	165 lb (75 kg)	Sr	Deer Park	Deer Park, New York
G	2	Kwei Lartey	6 ft 4 in (1.93 m)	200 lb (91 kg)	Jr	Spartanburg Methodist College	Atlanta, Georgia
G	3	Devonte Boykins	6 ft 2 in (1.88 m)	180 lb (82 kg)	GS	Georgia Southern; East Rutherford (NC)	Forest City, North Carolina
G	4	Kameron Langley	6 ft 2 in (1.88 m)	205 lb (93 kg)	Fr	Southwest Guilford	Greensboro, North Carolina
C	11	D'Andre Johnson	6 ft 10 in (2.08 m)	225 lb (102 kg)	Fr	Gould Academy	Washington, D.C.
G	13	Austin Williams	6 ft 1 in (1.85 m)	175 lb (79 kg)	Sr	Believe Prep Academy	Queens, New York
G	14	Raymon Pratt	6 ft 3 in (1.91 m)	197 lb (89 kg)	So	Ben L. Smith	Greensboro, North Carolina
G	15	Amari Hamilton	6 ft 1 in (1.85 m)	165 lb (75 kg)	RS Jr	Southern Durham	Durham, North Carolina
F	21	Japhet Kadji	6 ft 7 in (2.01 m)	205 lb (93 kg)	RS So	Wagner	Douala, Cameroon
G	22	Milik Gantz	6 ft 3 in (1.91 m)	180 lb (82 kg)	Jr	Harcum College	Harrisburg, Pennsylvania
G	23	Denzel Keyes	6 ft 4 in (1.93 m)	210 lb (95 kg)	RS Sr	Kinston	Kinston, North Carolina
G	24	Donte Watson	6 ft 6 in (1.98 m)	185 lb (84 kg)	Sr	Copiah–Lincoln CC	New Orleans, Louisiana
F	25	Femi Olujobi	6 ft 8 in (2.03 m)	233 lb (106 kg)	RS Jr	Oakland	Long Island, New York
G	30	Dalen Dotson	5 ft 11 in (1.8 m)	170 lb (77 kg)	So	Providence (NC)	Matthews, North Carolina
G	32	Myles Patten	6 ft 4 in (1.93 m)	185 lb (84 kg)	Fr	St. Anthony's (NY)	Brooklyn, New York

Head coach

- Jay Joyner (South Carolina State)

Assistant coach(es)

- Jack Agostino (St. Joseph's (NY))
- Willie Jones (South Carolina State)
- David Butts (Alvernia)

Legend

- (C) Team captain
- (S) Suspended
- (I) Ineligible
- (W) Walk-on
- Injured
- Current redshirt

Roster
Last update: December 31, 2017

== Schedule and results ==
Date time, TV	Rank^{#}	Opponent^{#}	Result	Record	Site (attendance) city, state
Non-conference regular season
Nov 10, 2017*; 8:00 pm, Lock TV		Greensboro College	W 104–80	1–0	Corbett Sports Center (2,157); Greensboro, NC
Nov 12, 2017*; 2:00 pm, ACCN Extra		at Clemson	L 63–87	1–1	Littlejohn Coliseum (5,528); Clemson, SC
Nov 15, 2017*; 7:00 pm		The Citadel	W 92–73	2–1	Corbett Sports Center (2,648); Greensboro, NC
Nov 18, 2017*; 6:00 pm, ESPN3		at Jacksonville	W 90–82 ^{OT}	3–1	Swisher Gymnasium (752); Jacksonville, FL
Nov 21, 2017*; 7:00 pm		Mid–Atlantic Christian	W 115–76	4–1	Corbett Sports Center (560); Greensboro, NC
Nov 26, 2017*; 4:00 pm, Lock TV/ESPN3		at East Carolina	W 87–81	5–1	Williams Arena (3,373); Greenville, NC
Nov 30, 2017*; 7:00 pm		at Central Connecticut	L 59–72	5–2	William H. Detrick Gymnasium (1,514); New Britain, CT
Dec 2, 2017*; 4:00 pm		at Presbyterian	L 70–73	5–3	Templeton Center (278); Clinton, SC
Dec 9, 2017*; 2:30 p.m., FS2		at Georgetown	L 74–83	5–4	Capital One Arena (5,127); Washington, D.C.
Dec 15, 2017*; 7:00 pm		Tennessee State	W 64–54	6–4	Corbett Sports Center (520); Greensboro, NC
Dec 17, 2017*; 12:30 pm		at Duquesne; Las Vegas Classic	L 58–74	6–5	Palumbo Center (1,201); Pittsburgh, PA
Dec 19, 2017*; 8:30 pm		at Southern Illinois; Las Vegas Classic	L 64–102	6–6	SIU Arena (3,058); Carbondale, IL
Dec 22, 2017*; 12:00 pm		vs. Radford	L 60–66	6–7	Orleans Arena; Paradise, NV
Dec 23, 2017*; 2:30 pm		vs. Lamar	W 74–70	7–7	Orleans Arena; LParadise, NV
Dec 28, 2017*; 4:00 pm, ACCN Extra		at Virginia Tech	L 59–76	7–8	Cassell Coliseum (6,979); Blacksburg, VA
MEAC regular season
Jan 6, 2018; 4:00 pm, Lock TV		Norfolk State; Postponed to Jan 17 (winter weather)			Corbett Sports Center; Greensboro, NC
Jan 8, 2018; 7:30 pm		at Delaware State	W 76–66	8–8 (1–0)	Memorial Hall (536); Dover, DE
Jan 13, 2018; 4:00 pm, Lock TV		Morgan State	W 69–67	9–8 (2–0)	Corbett Sports Center (2,614); Greensboro, NC
Jan 15, 2018; 7:30 pm, Lock TV		Coppin State	W 60–47	10–8 (3–0)	Corbett Sports Center (2,849); Greensboro, NC
Jan 17, 2018; 8:00 pm, Lock TV		Norfolk State; Postponed to Jan 18 (winter weather)			Corbett Sports Center; Greensboro, NC
Jan 18, 2018; 2:00 pm, Lock TV		Norfolk State	W 71–68	11–8 (4–0)	Corbett Sports Center (1,437); Greensboro, NC
Jan 20, 2018; 4:00 pm		Maryland Eastern Shore	W 66–64	12–8 (5–0)	Hytche Athletic Center (1,036); Princess Anne, MD
Jan 22, 2018; 7:30 pm		at Howard	L 88–90 ^{OT}	12–9 (5–1)	Burr Gymnasium (1,378); Washington, D.C.
Jan 27, 2018; 4:00 pm, Lock TV		North Carolina Central	W 70–64	13–9 (6–1)	Corbett Sports Center (5,700); Greensboro, NC
Feb 3, 2018; 4:00 pm, Lock TV		Hampton	W 92–84	14–9 (7–1)	Corbett Sports Center (1,953); Greensboro, NC
Feb 5, 2018; 7:30 pm, Lock TV		Delaware State	W 54–51	15–9 (8–1)	Corbett Sports Center (1,094); Greensboro, NC
Feb 10, 2018; 4:00 pm		at South Carolina State	L 85–90	15–10 (8–2)	SHM Memorial Center; Orangeburg, SC
Feb 12, 2018; 8:00 pm		at Savannah State	L 106–108	15–11 (8–3)	Tiger Arena (3,002); Savannah, GA
Feb 17, 2018; 4:00 pm, Lock TV		Howard	W 83–69	16–11 (9–3)	Corbett Sports Center (3,526); Greensboro, NC
Feb 19, 2018; 7:30 pm, Lock TV		Maryland Eastern Shore	W 78–69	17–11 (10–3)	Corbett Sports Center (1,780); Greensboro, NC
Feb 24, 2018; 6:00 pm		at Florida A&M	L 77–83	17–12 (10–4)	Teaching Gym (1,458); Tallahassee, FL
Feb 26, 2017; 7:30 pm		at Bethune–Cookman	W 86–80	18–12 (11–4)	Moore Gymnasium (943); Daytona Beach, FL
Mar 1, 2018; 7:30 pm		at North Carolina Central	L 59–70	18–13 (11–5)	McDougald–McLendon Gymnasium (3,036); Durham, NC
MEAC tournament
Mar 5, 2018; 6:30 pm, ESPN3	(4)	vs. (13) Delaware State; First round	W 62–61 ^{OT}	19–13	Norfolk Scope; Norfolk, VA
Mar 8, 2018; 8:00 pm, ESPN3	(4)	vs. (5) Norfolk State; Quarterfinals	W 70–64	20–13	Norfolk Scope (9,010); Norfolk, VA
Mar 9, 2018; 6:00 pm, ESPN3	(4)	vs. (1) Hampton; Semifinals	L 86–96	20–14	Norfolk Scope; Norfolk, VA
CIT
Mar 12, 2018*; 6:00 pm, CBSSN		at Liberty; First Round – Jim Phelan Classic	L 52–65	20–15	Vines Center (486); Lynchburg, VA
*Non-conference game. ^{#}Rankings from AP Poll. (#) Tournament seedings in parentheses. All times are in Eastern Time.
