= 2019 MEAC men's basketball tournament =

- Classification: Division I
- Season: 2018–19
- Teams: 11
- Site: Norfolk Scope; Norfolk, Virginia
- Champions: North Carolina Central (4th title)
- Winning coach: LeVelle Moton (4th title)
- MVP: Raasean Davis (North Carolina Central)
- Television: ESPN2, ESPN3

2018–19 MEAC men's basketball standings
	Conf.				Overall
Team	W		L	PCT	W		L	PCT
Norfolk State	14	–	2	.875	22	–	14	.611
North Carolina A&T	13	–	3	.813	19	–	13	.594
North Carolina Central †	10	–	6	.625	18	–	16	.529
Howard	10	–	6	.625	17	–	17	.500
Bethune–Cookman	9	–	7	.563	14	–	17	.452
Florida A&M*	9	–	7	.563	12	–	19	.387
Savannah State	8	–	8	.500	11	–	20	.355
Coppin State	7	–	9	.438	8	–	25	.242
MD Eastern Shore	5	–	11	.313	7	–	25	.219
South Carolina State	5	–	11	.313	8	–	26	.235
Morgan State	4	–	12	.250	9	–	21	.300
Delaware State	2	–	14	.125	6	–	25	.194
*ineligible for postseason due to APR violations
† 2019 MEAC tournament winner

The 2019 Mid-Eastern Athletic Conference men's basketball tournament was the postseason men's basketball tournament for the Mid-Eastern Athletic Conference. The tournament was held from March 11 through March 16, 2019 at the Norfolk Scope in Norfolk, Virginia. North Carolina Central defeated Norfolk State 50–47 in the championship game to win the tournament, and received the conference's automatic bid to the 2019 NCAA tournament. It was the third consecutive championship for North Carolina Central, and fourth in the last six seasons.

== Seeds ==
11 teams were seeded by record within the conference, with a tiebreaker system to seed teams with identical conference records. The top four teams received a first round bye. Florida A&M is ineligible for postseason play due to APR violations.

Seed	School	Conference	Tiebreaker
1	Norfolk State	14–2	
2	North Carolina A&T	13–3	
3	North Carolina Central	10–6	1–0 vs. Howard
4	Howard	10–6	0–1 vs. North Carolina Central
5	Bethune–Cookman	9–7	
6	Savannah State	8–8	
7	Coppin State	7–9	
8	MD Eastern Shore	5–11	1–0 vs. South Carolina State
9	South Carolina State	5–11	0–1 vs. Maryland Eastern Shore
10	Morgan State	4–12	
11	Delaware State	2–14	

== Schedule ==
Session	Game	Time	Matchup	Score	Television
First round – Monday, March 11
1	1	6:00 pm	No. 6 Savannah State vs. No. 11 Delaware State	67–71	FLOHOOPS (ppv)
First round – Tuesday, March 12
2	2	6:00 pm	No. 8 MD Eastern Shore vs. No. 9 South Carolina State	54–63	FLOHOOPS (ppv)
2	3	8:30 pm	No. 7 Coppin State vs. No. 10 Morgan State	81–71	FLOHOOPS (ppv)
Quarterfinals – Wednesday, March 13
3	4	6:00 pm	No. 1 Norfolk State vs. No. 9 South Carolina State	78–73	FLOHOOPS (ppv)
3	5	8:00 pm	No. 2 North Carolina A&T vs. No. 7 Coppin State	82–79 (OT)	FLOHOOPS (ppv)
Quarterfinals – Thursday, March 14
4	6	6:00 pm	No. 3 North Carolina Central vs. No. 11 Delaware State	75–57	FLOHOOPS (ppv)
4	7	8:00 pm	No. 4 Howard vs. No. 5 Bethune–Cookman	80–71	FLOHOOPS (ppv)
Semifinals – Friday, March 15
5	8	6:00 pm	No. 1 Norfolk State vs. No. 4 Howard	75–69	FLOHOOPS (ppv)
5	9	8:00 pm	No. 2 North Carolina A&T vs. No. 3 North Carolina Central	63–65	FLOHOOPS (ppv)
Championship – Saturday, March 16
6	10	1:00pm	No. 1 Norfolk State vs. No. 3 North Carolina Central	47–50	ESPN2
Game times in EST. Rankings denote tournament seeding.

== Bracket ==
First round March 11 and 12; FLOHOOPS
8	MD Eastern Shore	54
9	South Carolina State	63
7	Coppin State	81
10	Morgan State	71
6	Savannah State	67
11	Delaware State	71

Quarterfinals; March 13 and 14; FLOHOOPS
1	Norfolk State	78
9	South Carolina State	73
4	Howard	80
5	Bethune–Cookman	71
2	North Carolina A&T	82*
7	Coppin State	79
3	North Carolina Central	75
11	Delaware State	57

Semifinals; March 15; FLOHOOPS
1	Norfolk State	75
4	Howard	69
2	North Carolina A&T	63
3	North Carolina Central	65

Championship; March 16; ESPN2
1	Norfolk State	47
3	North Carolina Central	50

* denotes overtime period
