= 2018–19 Savannah State Tigers basketball team =

American college basketball season

2018–19 Savannah State Tigers basketball
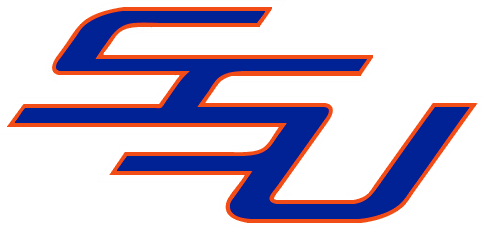
- Conference: Mid-Eastern Athletic Conference
- Record: 11–20 (8–8 MEAC)
- Head coach: Horace Broadnax (14th season)
- Assistant coaches: Clyde Wormley; Timothy "Pat" Hardy; Joseph Flegler
- Home arena: Tiger Arena

2018–19 MEAC men's basketball standings
	Conf.				Overall
Team	W		L	PCT	W		L	PCT
Norfolk State	14	–	2	.875	22	–	14	.611
North Carolina A&T	13	–	3	.813	19	–	13	.594
North Carolina Central †	10	–	6	.625	18	–	16	.529
Howard	10	–	6	.625	17	–	17	.500
Bethune–Cookman	9	–	7	.563	14	–	17	.452
Florida A&M*	9	–	7	.563	12	–	19	.387
Savannah State	8	–	8	.500	11	–	20	.355
Coppin State	7	–	9	.438	8	–	25	.242
MD Eastern Shore	5	–	11	.313	7	–	25	.219
South Carolina State	5	–	11	.313	8	–	26	.235
Morgan State	4	–	12	.250	9	–	21	.300
Delaware State	2	–	14	.125	6	–	25	.194
† 2019 MEAC tournament winner *ineligible for postseason due to APR violations

The 2018–19 Savannah State Tigers basketball team represented Savannah State University during the 2018–19 NCAA Division I men's basketball season. The Tigers, led by 14th-year head coach Horace Broadnax, played their home games at Tiger Arena in Savannah, Georgia as members of the Mid-Eastern Athletic Conference (MEAC). They finished the season 11–20 overall, 8–8 in MEAC play, to finish in seventh place. As the No. 7 seed in the MEAC tournament they lost in the first round to No. 11 seed Delaware State.

This season marked the Tigers' final season playing in Division I as they rejoined Division II after the season.

== Previous season ==
With a win over South Carolina State on March 1, 2018, the Tigers earned a share of the MEAC regular-season championship. They finished the season 15–17, 12–4 in MEAC play, finishing in a three-way tie for first place. Due to tie-breaking procedures, the Tigers received the No. 3 seed in the MEAC tournament, where they lost to North Carolina Central in the quarterfinals. The Tigers were initially ruled to be ineligible for postseason play for a second consecutive season due to APR violations. However, the NCAA granted the Tigers a waiver allowing them to participate in postseason play.

== Roster ==
2018–19 Savannah State Tigers men's basketball team
Players
Coaches

Pos.	#	Name	Height	Weight	Year	Hometown
F	00	Tyrell Harper	6 ft 7 in (2.01 m)	180 lb (82 kg)	Jr	Sanford, FL
G	1	Qua Smith	6 ft 1 in (1.85 m)	170 lb (77 kg)	Sr	Statesboro, GA
F	2	Collins Joseph	6 ft 0 in (1.83 m)	155 lb (70 kg)	Fr	St. Thomas, USVI
G	3	Zach Sellers	6 ft 1 in (1.85 m)	175 lb (79 kg)	Jr	Cheraw, SC
F	4	John Jr. Grant	6 ft 6 in (1.98 m)	208 lb (94 kg)	Jr	Baltimore, MD
F	5	Romani Hansen	6 ft 8 in (2.03 m)	200 lb (91 kg)	Jr	St. Croix, USVI
G	10	Adam Saeed	6 ft 6 in (1.98 m)	190 lb (86 kg)	Jr	Chicago, IL
G	11	Jaquan Dotson	6 ft 4 in (1.93 m)	195 lb (88 kg)	Jr	Philadelphia, MS
F	12	Jahlin Smith	6 ft 7 in (2.01 m)	180 lb (82 kg)	Sr	Barnwell, SC
G	14	Amaru Bryant	6 ft 4 in (1.93 m)	175 lb (79 kg)	Jr	Quincy, FL
G	32	Chris Dubose	6 ft 4 in (1.93 m)	185 lb (84 kg)	Fr	Stockbridge, GA

Head coach

- Horace Broadnax (Georgetown)

Assistant coach(es)

- Clyde Wormley (The Citadel)
- Timothy "Pat" Hardy (Savannah State)
- Joseph Flegler (Savannah State)

Legend

- (C) Team captain
- (S) Suspended
- (I) Ineligible
- (W) Walk-on
- Injured
- Current redshirt

Roster
Last update: July 2, 2024

== Schedule and results ==
Date time, TV	Rank^{#}	Opponent^{#}	Result	Record	Site (attendance) city, state
Exhibition
November 1, 2018*; 7:30 p.m.		Thomas	W 111–107		Tiger Arena (1,450); Savannah, GA
Non-conference regular season
November 7, 2018*; 9:30 p.m., SECN+		at Texas A&M	L 83–98	0–1	Reed Arena (6,757); College Station, TX
November 9, 2018*; 8:30 p.m., SECN+		at Georgia	L 76–110	0–2	Stegeman Coliseum (9,018); Athens, GA
November 11, 2018*; 4:00 p.m.		Middle Georgia State	W 105–95	1–2	Tiger Arena (960); Savannah, GA
November 13, 2018*; 7:00 p.m.		Tennessee Tech	W 97–83	2–2	Tiger Arena (1,029); Savannah, GA
November 16, 2018*; 7:00 p.m.		Gardner–Webb	L 77–97	2–3	Tiger Arena (755); Savannah, GA
November 20, 2018*; 7:00 p.m., ESPN+		at Kent State; Commodore Classic	L 84–104	2–4	MAC Center (1,925); Kent, OH
November 24, 2018*; 2:00 p.m.		vs. Alcorn State; Commodore Classic	W 80–75	3–4	Vines Center (50); Lynchburg, VA
November 25, 2018*; 2:00 p.m., ESPN+		at Liberty; Commodore Classic	L 56–82	3–5	Vines Center (1,943); Lynchburg, VA
November 27, 2018*; 7:00 p.m., SECN+		vs. Vanderbilt; Commodore Classic	L 85–120	3–6	Memorial Gymnasium (8,271); Nashville, TN
December 1, 2018*; 3:00 p.m., ESPN+		at Gardner–Webb	L 60–97	3–7	Paul Porter Arena (1,559); Boiling Springs, NC
December 11, 2018*; 8:00 p.m., ESPN+		at South Dakota State	L 72–139	3–8	Frost Arena (1,776); Brookings, SD
December 13, 2018*; 8:00 p.m., BTN		at No. 16 Wisconsin	L 60–101	3–9	Kohl Center (17,004); Madison, WI
December 20, 2018*; 7:00 p.m., ESPN+		at Tennessee Tech	L 80–91	3–10	Eblen Center (807); Cookeville, TN
December 22, 2018*; 1:00 p.m., BTN+		at No. 23 Iowa	L 64–110	3–11	Carver–Hawkeye Arena (13,444); Iowa City, IA
MEAC regular season
January 5, 2019; 4:00 p.m.		at Coppin State	L 67–73	3–12 (0–1)	Physical Education Complex; Baltimore, MD
January 8, 2019; 7:30 p.m.		at Morgan State	W 88–87	4–12 (1–1)	Talmadge L. Hill Field House; Baltimore, MD
January 12, 2019; 4:00 p.m.		at Florida A&M	L 64–69	4–13 (1–2)	Teaching Gym; Tallahassee, FL
January 19, 2019; 6:00 p.m.		Norfolk State	L 76–82	4–14 (1–3)	Tiger Arena; Savannah, GA
January 26, 2019; 6:00 p.m.		South Carolina State	W 92–88	5–14 (2–3)	Tiger Arena; Savannah, GA
January 28, 2019; 7:30 p.m.		North Carolina Central	L 78–82	5–15 (2–4)	Tiger Arena; Savannah, GA
February 2, 2019; 4:00 p.m.		at Delaware State	W 76–73	6–15 (3–4)	Memorial Hall; Dover, DE
February 4, 2019; 7:30 p.m.		at Maryland Eastern Shore	W 68–63	7–15 (4–4)	Hytche Athletic Center; Princess Anne, MD
February 9, 2019; 6:00 p.m.		Coppin State	W 71–62	8–15 (5–4)	Tiger Arena; Savannah, GA
February 11, 2019; 7:30 p.m.		Morgan State	W 88–85	9–15 (6–4)	Tiger Arena; Savannah, GA
February 16, 2019; 6:00 p.m.		Florida A&M	L 74–78	9–16 (6–5)	Tiger Arena; Savannah, GA
February 18, 2019; 7:30 p.m.		Bethune–Cookman	W 79–70	10–16 (7–5)	Tiger Arena; Savannah, GA
February 23, 2019; 4:00 p.m.		at North Carolina Central	L 69–78	10–17 (7–6)	McDougald–McLendon Gymnasium; Durham, NC
February 25, 2019; 7:30 p.m.		at North Carolina A&T	L 58–63	10–18 (7–7)	Corbett Sports Center; Greensboro, NC
March 2, 2019; 6:00 p.m.		Howard	L 76–81	10–19 (7–8)	Tiger Arena; Savannah, GA
March 7, 2019; 7:30 p.m.		at South Carolina State	W 90–87	11–19 (8–8)	SHM Memorial Center; Orangeburg, SC
MEAC tournament
March 11, 2019; 6:00 p.m., FloHoops	(6)	vs. (11) Delaware State; First round	L 67–71	11–20	Norfolk Scope; Norfolk, VA
*Non-conference game. ^{#}Rankings from AP poll. (#) Tournament seedings in parentheses. All times are in Eastern.
