= 2018–19 Norfolk State Spartans men's basketball team =

American college basketball season

2018–19 Norfolk State Spartans men's basketball
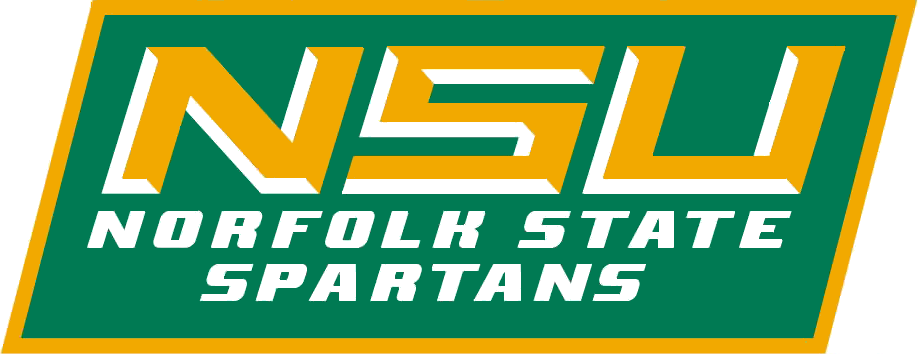

MEAC regular season champions

NIT, Second Round
- Conference: Mid-Eastern Athletic Conference
- Record: 22–14 (14–2 MEAC)
- Head coach: Robert Jones (6th season)
- Assistant coaches: C.J. Clemons; Jamal Brown; Leonard Fairley
- Home arena: Joseph G. Echols Memorial Hall

2018–19 MEAC men's basketball standings
	Conf.				Overall
Team	W		L	PCT	W		L	PCT
Norfolk State	14	–	2	.875	22	–	14	.611
North Carolina A&T	13	–	3	.813	19	–	13	.594
North Carolina Central †	10	–	6	.625	18	–	16	.529
Howard	10	–	6	.625	17	–	17	.500
Bethune–Cookman	9	–	7	.563	14	–	17	.452
Florida A&M*	9	–	7	.563	12	–	19	.387
Savannah State	8	–	8	.500	11	–	20	.355
Coppin State	7	–	9	.438	8	–	25	.242
MD Eastern Shore	5	–	11	.313	7	–	25	.219
South Carolina State	5	–	11	.313	8	–	26	.235
Morgan State	4	–	12	.250	9	–	21	.300
Delaware State	2	–	14	.125	6	–	25	.194
† 2019 MEAC tournament winner *ineligible for postseason due to APR violations

The 2018–19 Norfolk State Spartans men's basketball team represented Norfolk State University during the 2018–19 NCAA Division I men's basketball season. The Spartans, led by sixth-year coach Robert Jones, played their home games at the Joseph G. Echols Memorial Hall in Norfolk, Virginia as members of the Mid-Eastern Athletic Conference. They finished the season 22–14 overall, 14–2 in MEAC play to finish in first place, and win the MEAC regular season championship. As the No. 1 seed in the MEAC tournament, they were upset in the championship game by No. 3 seed North Carolina Central. As a conference champion who failed to win their conference tournament, and not selected to participate in the NCAA tournament, they were awarded an automatic bid to the NIT. Given a No. 8 seed in the Alabama bracket, they upset No. 1 seed Alabama in the first round, then were defeated in the second round by No. 4 seed Colorado.

== Previous season ==
The Spartans finished the 2017–18 season 14–19, 11–5 in MEAC play to finish in a tie for fourth place. As the No. 5 seed in the MEAC tournament, they defeated Maryland Eastern Shore before losing to North Carolina A&T in the quarterfinals.

== Roster ==
2018–19 Norfolk State Spartans men's basketball team
Players
Coaches

Pos.	#	Name	Height	Weight	Year	Hometown
G	0	Mastadi Pitt	6 ft 1 in (1.85 m)	210 lb (95 kg)	RS So	Hampton, Virginia
G	1	BJ Fitzgerald	6 ft 6 in (1.98 m)	200 lb (91 kg)	Fr	Danville, Virginia
F	3	Obi Momah	6 ft 7 in (2.01 m)	240 lb (109 kg)	RS Sr	Unionville, Connecticut
G	4	Joe Bryant Jr.	6 ft 1 in (1.85 m)	225 lb (102 kg)	Fr	Norfolk, Virginia
F	5	Armani Branch	6 ft 7 in (2.01 m)	210 lb (95 kg)	RS Sr	Hampton, Virginia
G	11	Jermaine Bishop	6 ft 1 in (1.85 m)	180 lb (82 kg)	RS Jr	Queens, New York
G	14	Nic Thomas	6 ft 2 in (1.88 m)	185 lb (84 kg)	RS Jr	Arlington, Texas
G	15	CJ Kelly	6 ft 5 in (1.96 m)	190 lb (86 kg)	RS Fr	Long Island, New York
F	22	Alex Long	6 ft 8 in (2.03 m)	225 lb (102 kg)	Sr	Clinton, Maryland
F	32	Chris Ford	6 ft 8 in (2.03 m)	220 lb (100 kg)	Fr	Chesterfield, Virginia
G	34	Steven Whitley	6 ft 3 in (1.91 m)	220 lb (100 kg)	RS Jr	Norfolk, Virginia
G	35	Derrik Jamerson, Jr.	6 ft 5 in (1.96 m)	180 lb (82 kg)	RS Sr	Detroit, Michigan
F	45	Jordan Butler	6 ft 6 in (1.98 m)	245 lb (111 kg)	RS Sr	Hartford, Connecticut
G	55	Kyonze Chavis	6 ft 4 in (1.93 m)	185 lb (84 kg)	RS So	Chesapeake, Virginia

Head coach

- Robert Jones (SUNY New Paltz)

Assistant coach(es)

- Leonard Fairley (Norfolk State)
- C.J. Clemons (Norfolk State)
- Jamal Brown (South Carolina State)

Legend

- (C) Team captain
- (S) Suspended
- (I) Ineligible
- (W) Walk-on
- Injured
- Current redshirt

Roster
Last update: October 19, 2018

== Schedule and results ==
Date time, TV	Rank^{#}	Opponent^{#}	Result	Record	Site city, state
Exhibition
Nov 2, 2018*; 7:00 pm		Virginia State	W 77–70		Joseph G. Echols Memorial Hall (2,115); Norfolk, VA
Regular season
Nov 6, 2018*; 8:30 pm, BTN		at No. 19 Michigan	L 44–63	0–1	Crisler Center (10,109); Ann Arbor, MI
Nov 8, 2018*; 7:00 pm		Mid-Atlantic Christian	W 108–50	1–1	Joseph G. Echols Memorial Hall (1,336); Norfolk, VA
Nov 10, 2018*; 7:00 pm		at Clarion	W 74–46	2–1	Joseph G. Echols Memorial Hall (1,486); Norfolk, VA
Nov 13, 2018*; 7:00 pm, SECN+		at South Carolina; Hall of Fame Tip Off	L 64–81	2–2	Colonial Life Arena (9,038); Columbia, SC
Nov 16, 2018*; 8:30 pm, ESPN3		vs. Siena; Hall of Fame Tip Off	L 58–61	2–3	Uncasville, CT (1,313); Mohegan Sun Arena
Nov 17, 2018*; 8:30 pm, ESPN3		vs. Stony Brook; Hall of Fame Tip-Off	L 65–72	2–4	Mohegan Sun Arena; Uncasville, CT
Nov 20, 2018*; 7:00 pm		Regent	W 97–57	3–4	Joseph G. Echols Memorial Hall (656); Norfolk, VA
Nov 27, 2018*; 7:00 pm		Stony Brook	L 73–79	3–5	Joseph G. Echols Memorial Hall (1,712); Norfolk, VA
Nov 29, 2018*; 7:00 pm		Hampton	W 94–89 ^{2OT}	4–5	Joseph G. Echols Memorial Hall (4,500); Norfolk, VA
Dec 1, 2018; 4:00 pm		at Kent State	L 67–78	4–6	MAC Center (1,927); Kent, OH
Dec 12, 2018*; 7:00 pm		at Rider	L 71–81	4–7	Alumni Gymnasium (1,587); Lawrenceville, NJ
Dec 16, 2018*; 4:00 pm, ESPN+		at Loyola Chicago	L 49–80	4–8	Joseph J. Gentile Arena (3,412); Chicago, IL
Dec 21, 2018*; 7:00 pm		at UTEP; Sun Bowl Invitational	W 75–62	5–8	Don Haskins Center (4,284); El Paso, TX
Dec 22, 2018*; 9:00 pm		vs. East Tennessee State; Sun Bowl Invitational championship	L 61–89	5–9	Don Haskins Center (4,011); El Paso, TX
Dec 29, 2018; 3:00 pm		at Niagara	L 75–83	5–10	Gallagher Center (898); Lewiston, NY
MEAC regular season
Jan 5, 2019; 6:30 pm		Delaware State	W 77–63	6–10 (1–0)	Joseph G. Echols Memorial Hall (1,669); Norfolk, VA
Jan 7, 2019; 8:00 pm		Florida A&M	W 72–62	7–10 (2–0)	Joseph G. Echols Memorial Hall (1,770); Norfolk, VA
Jan 12, 2019; 7:00 pm		at Coppin State	W 80–66	8–10 (3–0)	Physical Education Complex (4112); Baltimore, MD
Jan 14, 2019; 8:00 pm		Bethune–Cookman	W 75–68	9–10 (4–0)	Joseph G. Echols Memorial Hall (1,802); Norfolk, VA
Jan 19, 2019; 6:00 pm		at Savannah State	W 82–76	10–10 (5–0)	Tiger Arena (3,500); Savannah, GA
Jan 21, 2019; 7:30 pm		at South Carolina State	W 74–69	11–10 (6–0)	SHM Memorial Center (495); Orangeburg, SC
Jan 26, 2019; 6:30 pm		Maryland Eastern Shore	W 88–60	12–10 (7–0)	Joseph G. Echols Memorial Hall (3,184); Norfolk, VA
Feb 2, 2019; 6:30 pm		at Howard	W 80–78	13–10 (8–0)	Burr Gymnasium (2,284); Washington, D.C.
Feb 9, 2019; 4:00 pm		at Bethune–Cookman	L 76–84	13–11 (8–1)	Moore Gymnasium (904); Daytona Beach, FL
Feb 11, 2019; 7:30 pm, ESPNU		at Florida A&M	W 66–54	14–11 (9–1)	Teaching Gym (3,687); Tallahassee, FL
Feb 16, 2019; 6:30 pm		North Carolina Central	W 75–71 ^{OT}	15–11 (10–1)	Joseph G. Echols Memorial Hall (3,868); Norfolk, VA
Feb 18, 2019; 8:00 pm		North Carolina A&T	W 76–58	16–11 (11–1)	Joseph G. Echols Memorial Hall (3,913); Norfolk, VA
Feb 23, 2019; 4:00 pm		at Morgan State	W 75–74	17–11 (12–1)	Talmadge L. Hill Field House (1,789); Baltimore, MD
Mar 2, 2018; 6:30 pm		Coppin State	W 72–38	18–11 (13–1)	Joseph G. Echols Memorial Hall (2,361); Norfolk, VA
Mar 4, 2019; 7:300 pm		at Delaware State	W 74–66	19–11 (14–1)	Memorial Hall (974); Dover, DE
Mar 7, 2019; 8:00 pm		Howard	L 95–98	19–12 (14–2)	Joseph G. Echols Memorial Hall (2,469); Norfolk, VA
MEAC tournament
Mar 13, 2019; 6:00 pm, ESPN3	(1)	vs. (9) South Carolina State; Quarterfinals	W 78–73	20–12	Norfolk Scope; Norfolk, VA
Mar 15, 2019; 6:00 pm, ESPN3	(1)	vs. (4) Howard; Semifinals	W 75–69	21–12	Norfolk Scope; Norfolk, VA
Mar 16, 2019; 1:00 pm, ESPN2	(1)	vs. (3) North Carolina Central; Championship	L 47–50	21–13	Norfolk Scope; Norfolk, VA
NIT
Mar 20, 2019*; 7:00 pm, ESPNU	(8)	at (1) Alabama; First Round – Alabama Bracket	W 80–79 ^{OT}	22–13	Coleman Coliseum (2,086); Tuscaloosa, AL
Mar 25, 2019*; 9:00 pm, ESPN2	(8)	at (4) Colorado; Second Round – Alabama Bracket	L 60–76	22–14	CU Events Center; Boulder, CO
*Non-conference game. ^{#}Rankings from AP Poll. (#) Tournament seedings in parentheses. All times are in Eastern Time.
