= 2018–19 Coppin State Eagles men's basketball team =

American college basketball season

2018–19 Coppin State Eagles men's basketball
- Conference: Mid-Eastern Athletic Conference
- Record: 8-25 (7-9 MEAC)
- Head coach: Juan Dixon (2nd season)
- Assistant coaches: John Auslander; Charles Agumagu
- Home arena: Physical Education Complex

2018–19 MEAC men's basketball standings
| | Conf. | | | | Overall |
| Team | W | | L | PCT | W | | L | PCT |
|---|---|---|---|---|---|---|---|---|
| Norfolk State | 14 | – | 2 | .875 | 22 | – | 14 | .611 |
| North Carolina A&T | 13 | – | 3 | .813 | 19 | – | 13 | .594 |
| North Carolina Central † | 10 | – | 6 | .625 | 18 | – | 16 | .529 |
| Howard | 10 | – | 6 | .625 | 17 | – | 17 | .500 |
| Bethune–Cookman | 9 | – | 7 | .563 | 14 | – | 17 | .452 |
| Florida A&M* | 9 | – | 7 | .563 | 12 | – | 19 | .387 |
| Savannah State | 8 | – | 8 | .500 | 11 | – | 20 | .355 |
| Coppin State | 7 | – | 9 | .438 | 8 | – | 25 | .242 |
| MD Eastern Shore | 5 | – | 11 | .313 | 7 | – | 25 | .219 |
| South Carolina State | 5 | – | 11 | .313 | 8 | – | 26 | .235 |
| Morgan State | 4 | – | 12 | .250 | 9 | – | 21 | .300 |
| Delaware State | 2 | – | 14 | .125 | 6 | – | 25 | .194 |
† 2019 MEAC tournament winner *ineligible for postseason due to APR violations

The 2018–19 Coppin State Eagles men's basketball team represented Coppin State University in the 2018–19 NCAA Division I men's basketball season. They played their home games at the Physical Education Complex in Baltimore, Maryland, and were led by 2nd-year head coach Juan Dixon.

== Previous season ==
The Eagles finished the 2017–18 season 5–27, 5–11 in MEAC play to finish in 11th place. They lost in the first round of the MEAC tournament to North Carolina Central.

== Roster ==
2018–19 Coppin State Eagles men's basketball team
Players
Coaches

| Pos. | # | Name | Height | Weight | Year | Previous school | Hometown |
|---|---|---|---|---|---|---|---|
| G | 0 | Ibn Williams | 5 ft 11 in (1.8 m) | 170 lb (77 kg) | Fr | Bishop McNamara | Newark, NJ |
| F | 1 | Chad Andrews-Fulton | 6 ft 7 in (2.01 m) | 215 lb (98 kg) | Sr | Baltimore City CC | Philadelphia, PA |
| G | 2 | Taqwain Drummond | 6 ft 4 in (1.93 m) | 185 lb (84 kg) | So | Woodside | Newport News, VA |
| F | 3 | Giir Ring | 6 ft 8 in (2.03 m) | 215 lb (98 kg) | Fr | Bella Vista College Prep | Sydney, Australia |
| G/F | 4 | Nigel Marshall | 6 ft 5 in (1.96 m) | 210 lb (95 kg) | Fr | Bishop McNamara | Irvington, NJ |
| F | 5 | Cedric Council | 6 ft 8 in (2.03 m) | 220 lb (100 kg) | Sr | Gordon State College | Kennesaw, GA |
| G/F | 11 | Justin Steers | 6 ft 6 in (1.98 m) | 195 lb (88 kg) | Fr | Greater Hope Christian Academy | Philadelphia, PA |
| G | 13 | Dejuan Clayton | 6 ft 2 in (1.88 m) | 185 lb (84 kg) | RS So | St. John's College HS | Bowie, MD |
| F | 20 | Jordan Hardwick | 6 ft 7 in (2.01 m) | 205 lb (93 kg) | So | Springfield Commonwealth Academy | Wethersfield, CT |
| G | 21 | Lucian Brownlee | 6 ft 2 in (1.88 m) | 175 lb (79 kg) | Sr | Haddon Heights | Lawnside, NJ |
| G/F | 22 | Lamar Morgan | 6 ft 6 in (1.98 m) | 200 lb (91 kg) | Sr | Mineral Area College | Willingboro, NJ |
| G/F | 23 | Kent Auslander | 6 ft 6 in (1.98 m) | 200 lb (91 kg) | GS | Maryland | Herndon, VA |
| C | 25 | Brendan Medley-Bacon | 7 ft 0 in (2.13 m) | 235 lb (107 kg) | Fr | Archbishop Curley | Baltimore, MD |

Head coach

- Juan Dixon (Maryland)

Assistant coach(es)

- John Auslander (Maryland)
- Charles Agumagu (Barry)

Legend

- (C) Team captain
- (S) Suspended
- (I) Ineligible
- (W) Walk-on
- Injured
- Current redshirt

Roster
Last update: January 10, 2019

== Schedule and results ==
| Date time, TV | Rank^{#} | Opponent^{#} | Result | Record | Site (attendance) city, state |
Non-conference regular season
| November 6, 2018*; 8:00 pm, BTN Plus | | at Wisconsin | L 63–85 | 0–1 | Kohl Center (17,287); Madison, Wisconsin |
| November 10, 2018*; 7:00 pm, ESPN+ | | at Dayton; Battle 4 Atlantis campus-site game | L 46–76 | 0–2 | UD Arena (12,849); Dayton, Ohio |
| November 14, 2018*; 7:00 pm | | at Navy | L 58–77 | 0–3 | Alumni Hall (664); Annapolis, Maryland |
| November 16, 2018*; 7:00 pm, ACC Network | | at No. 4 Virginia; Battle 4 Atlantis campus-site game | L 40–97 | 0–4 | John Paul Jones Arena (13,971); Charlottesville, Virginia |
| November 19, 2018*; 7:00 pm, ESPN3 | | at Rider | L 67–87 | 0–5 | Alumni Gymnasium (1,545); Lawrenceville, New Jersey |
| November 21, 2018*; 7:00 pm, ESPN3 | | at Wofford; Battle 4 Atlantis | L 65–99 | 0–6 | Jerry Richardson Indoor Stadium (1,480); Spartanburg, South Carolina |
| November 23, 2018*; 3:30 pm, ESPN3 | | vs. Charleston Southern; Battle 4 Atlantis | L 67–93 | 0–7 | Jerry Richardson Indoor Stadium (400); Spartanburg, South Carolina |
| November 29, 2018*; 7:00 pm | | at James Madison | L 71–81 ^{OT} | 0–8 | JMU Convocation Center (2,314); Harrisonburg, Virginia |
| December 3, 2018*; 7:00 pm | | UMBC | L 60–71 | 0–9 | Physical Education Complex (727); Baltimore, Maryland |
| December 5, 2018*; 7:00 pm, NBC Sports Washington | | at Richmond | L 47–82 | 0–10 | Robins Center (4,220); Richmond, Virginia |
| December 9, 2018*; 3:00 pm | | Tennessee State | L 55–64 | 0–11 | Physical Education Complex (347); Baltimore, Maryland |
| December 12, 2018*; 7:00 pm, ESPN3 | | at UNC Greensboro | L 54–77 | 0–12 | Greensboro Coliseum (1,877); Greensboro, North Carolina |
| December 21, 2018*; 8:00 pm | | at Louisiana–Monroe | L 63–80 | 0–13 | Fant–Ewing Coliseum (1,427); Monroe, Louisiana |
| December 23, 2018*; 4:00 pm | | at No. 21 Houston | L 44–75 | 0–14 | Fertitta Center (5,383); Houston, Texas |
| December 29, 2018*; 12:00 pm, ACC Network Extra | | at Notre Dame | L 56–63 | 0–15 | Edmund P. Joyce Center (8,086); Notre Dame, Indiana |
MEAC regular season
| January 5, 2019; 4:00 pm | | Savannah State | W 73–67 | 1–15 (1–0) | Physical Education Complex (317); Baltimore, Maryland |
| January 7, 2019; 7:30 pm | | at Delaware State | W 64–60 | 2–15 (2–0) | Memorial Hall (954); Dover, Delaware |
| January 12, 2019; 4:00 pm | | Norfolk State | L 66-80 | 2-16 (2-1) | Physical Education Complex; Baltimore, Maryland |
| January 14, 2019; 7:30 pm | | South Carolina State | L 68-70 | 2-17 (2-2) | Physical Education Complex; Baltimore, Maryland |
| January 19, 2019; 4:00 pm | | at North Carolina Central | W 64-60 | 3-17 (3-2) | McDougald–McLendon Gymnasium; Durham, North Carolina |
| January 21, 2019; 7:30 pm | | at North Carolina A&T | L 71-80 | 3-18 (3-3) | Corbett Sports Center; Greensboro, North Carolina |
| January 26, 2019; 4:00 pm | | Florida A&M | L 70-72 | 3-19 (3-4) | Physical Education Complex; Baltimore, Maryland |
| January 28, 2019; 7:30 pm | | Bethune–Cookman | W 95-91 | 4-19 (4-4) | Physical Education Complex; Baltimore, Maryland |
| February 2, 2019; 4:00 pm | | Morgan State | W 73-71 | 5-19 (5-4) | Physical Education Complex; Baltimore, Maryland |
| February 9, 2019; 4:00 pm | | at Savannah State | L 62-71 | 5-20 (5-5) | Tiger Arena; Savannah, Georgia |
| February 11, 2019; 7:30 pm | | at South Carolina State | L 84-85 | 5-21 (5-6) | SHM Memorial Center; Orangeburg, South Carolina |
| February 16, 2019; 4:00 pm | | at Maryland Eastern Shore | W 58-55 | 6-21 (6-6) | Hytche Athletic Center; Princess Anne, Maryland |
| February 23, 2019; 4:00 pm | | Howard | L 73-74 | 6-22 (6-7) | Physical Education Complex; Baltimore, Maryland |
| February 25, 2019; 7:30 pm | | Delaware State | L 60-70 | 6-23 (6-8) | Physical Education Complex; Baltimore, Maryland |
| March 2, 2019; 4:00 pm | | at Norfolk State | L 38-72 | 6-24 (6-9) | Joseph G. Echols Memorial Hall; Norfolk, Virginia |
| March 7, 2019; 7:30 pm | | at Morgan State | W 83-69 | 7-24 (7-9) | Talmadge L. Hill Field House (4,213); Baltimore, Maryland |
MEAC tournament
| March 12, 2019; 8:30 pm | | vs. Morgan State; First round | W 81-71 | 8-24 | Norfolk Scope; Norfolk, Virginia |
| March 13, 2019; 8:00 pm | | vs. North Carolina A&T | L 79-82 ^{OT} | 8-25 | Norfolk Scope; Norfolk, Virginia |
*Non-conference game. ^{#}Rankings from AP Poll. (#) Tournament seedings in parentheses. All times are in Eastern.
