= 2018–19 North Carolina Central Eagles men's basketball team =

American college basketball season

2018–19 North Carolina Central Eagles men's basketball

MEAC tournament champions

NCAA tournament, First Four
- Conference: Mid-Eastern Athletic Conference
- Record: 18–16 (10–6 MEAC)
- Head coach: LeVelle Moton (10th season)
- Assistant coaches: Luke D'Alessio; Reggie Sharp; Eric Wilson
- Home arena: McDougald–McLendon Gymnasium

2018–19 MEAC men's basketball standings
| | Conf. | | | | Overall |
| Team | W | | L | PCT | W | | L | PCT |
|---|---|---|---|---|---|---|---|---|
| Norfolk State | 14 | – | 2 | .875 | 22 | – | 14 | .611 |
| North Carolina A&T | 13 | – | 3 | .813 | 19 | – | 13 | .594 |
| North Carolina Central † | 10 | – | 6 | .625 | 18 | – | 16 | .529 |
| Howard | 10 | – | 6 | .625 | 17 | – | 17 | .500 |
| Bethune–Cookman | 9 | – | 7 | .563 | 14 | – | 17 | .452 |
| Florida A&M* | 9 | – | 7 | .563 | 12 | – | 19 | .387 |
| Savannah State | 8 | – | 8 | .500 | 11 | – | 20 | .355 |
| Coppin State | 7 | – | 9 | .438 | 8 | – | 25 | .242 |
| MD Eastern Shore | 5 | – | 11 | .313 | 7 | – | 25 | .219 |
| South Carolina State | 5 | – | 11 | .313 | 8 | – | 26 | .235 |
| Morgan State | 4 | – | 12 | .250 | 9 | – | 21 | .300 |
| Delaware State | 2 | – | 14 | .125 | 6 | – | 25 | .194 |
† 2019 MEAC tournament winner *ineligible for postseason due to APR violations

The 2018–19 North Carolina Central Eagles men's basketball team represented North Carolina Central University in the 2018–19 NCAA Division I men's basketball season. They played their home games at McDougald–McLendon Gymnasium in Durham, North Carolina, and were led by 10th-year head coach LeVelle Moton. They finished the season 18-16, to finish a tie for 3rd place. In the MEAC tournament, they defeated Delaware State, North Carolina A&T, and Norfolk State to win the MEAC Tournament. Therefore, they received an automatic bid to the NCAA tournament as a 16th seed. However, they lost to fellow 16th seed North Dakota State in the First Four.

== Previous season ==
The Eagles finished the 2017–18 season 19–16, 9–7 in MEAC play to finish sixth place. In the MEAC tournament, they defeated Coppin State, Savannah State, and Morgan State to advance to the championship game against Hampton, which they won, to receive the conference's automatic bid to the NCAA tournament for the second consecutive year. As a No. 16 seed, they lost in the First Four to Texas Southern.

== Roster ==
2018–19 North Carolina Central Eagles men's basketball team
Players
Coaches

| Pos. | # | Name | Height | Weight | Year | Previous school | Hometown |
|---|---|---|---|---|---|---|---|
| G/F | 0 | Larry McKnight Jr. | 6 ft 4 in (1.93 m) | 235 lb (107 kg) | RS Sr | Palm Beach State College | North Miami, FL |
| F | 1 | Zacarry Douglas | 6 ft 8 in (2.03 m) | 215 lb (98 kg) | Sr | Cal State Northridge | Landover, MD |
| F | 2 | Jibri Blount | 6 ft 5 in (1.96 m) | 225 lb (102 kg) | RS Jr | Cleveland State | Pittsburgh, PA |
| F | 3 | Roderick Taylor Jr. | 6 ft 7 in (2.01 m) | 215 lb (98 kg) | RS Sr | Louisiana–Monroe | Killeen, TX |
| PG | 4 | Jordan Perkins | 6 ft 1 in (1.85 m) | 190 lb (86 kg) | So | Greensboro Day School | Greensboro, NC |
| G/F | 5 | Reggie Gardner Jr. | 6 ft 3 in (1.91 m) | 175 lb (79 kg) | So | Loomis Chaffee School | Bowie, MD |
| G/F | 10 | Rashann London | 6 ft 2 in (1.88 m) | 185 lb (84 kg) | RS Sr | Drexel | Philadelphia, PA |
| G | 11 | Randy Miller Jr. | 6 ft 2 in (1.88 m) | 190 lb (86 kg) | Jr | Moberly Area CC | Odenton, MD |
| G | 20 | Julian Walters | 5 ft 10 in (1.78 m) | 175 lb (79 kg) | RS Sr | Alabama A&M | Madison, WI |
| G | 24 | Nicolas Fennell | 6 ft 3 in (1.91 m) | 150 lb (68 kg) | RS Fr | Archbishop Carroll | Bowie, MD |
| C | 32 | Raasean Davis | 6 ft 9 in (2.06 m) | 240 lb (109 kg) | RS Sr | Kent State | Chicago, IL |
| G | 55 | John Guerra | 6 ft 1 in (1.85 m) | 205 lb (93 kg) | RS Jr | Navy | Cary, NC |

Head coach

- LeVelle Moton (North Carolina Central)

Assistant coach(es)

- Luke D'Alessio (Catholic)
- Reggie Sharp (Auburn)
- Eric Wilson (Western Carolina)

Legend

- (C) Team captain
- (S) Suspended
- (I) Ineligible
- (W) Walk-on
- Injured
- Current redshirt

Roster
Last update: December 31, 2018

== Schedule and results ==
| Date time, TV | Rank^{#} | Opponent^{#} | Result | Record | Site (attendance) city, state |
Non-conference regular season
| November 9, 2018*; 7:00 pm, ACCN Extra | | at No. 22 Clemson | L 51–71 | 0–1 | Littlejohn Coliseum (7,208); Clemson, South Carolina |
| November 13, 2018*; 7:00 pm, FSOH/ESPN3 | | at Cincinnati; Emerald Coast Classic first round | L 51–73 | 0–2 | Fifth Third Arena (10,037); Cincinnati, Ohio |
| November 15, 2018*; 7:00 pm, ESPN3 | | at Bowling Green | L 60–75 | 0–3 | Stroh Center (1,363); Bowling Green, Ohio |
| November 18, 2018*; 2:00 pm | | Warren Wilson | W 123–57 | 1–3 | McDougald–McLendon Gymnasium (923); Durham, North Carolina |
| November 20, 2018*; 7:00 pm, ESPN+ | | at George Mason; Emerald Coast Classic second round | L 63–78 | 1–4 | EagleBank Arena (2,603); Fairfax, Virginia |
| November 23, 2018*; 2:30 pm | | vs. Nicholls State; Emerald Coast Classic third round | L 63–77 | 1–5 | The Arena at Northwest Florida State College (135); Niceville, Florida |
| November 24, 2018*; 11:00 am | | vs. Southern; Emerald Coast Classic 3rd place game | W 83–71 | 2–5 | The Arena at Northwest Florida State College (115); Niceville, Florida |
| November 28, 2018*; 7:00 pm | | Christendom | W 110–51 | 3–5 | McDougald–McLendon Gymnasium (558); Durham, North Carolina |
| December 1, 2018*; 4:00 pm | | McNeese State | W 67–66 | 4–5 | McDougald–McLendon Gymnasium (1,076); Durham, North Carolina |
| December 8, 2018*; 2:00 pm, ESPN+ | | at Appalachian State | L 73–82 | 4–6 | George M. Holmes Convocation Center (827); Boone, North Carolina |
| December 13, 2018*; 7:30 pm, Cowboy Insider | | at McNeese State | L 61–77 | 4–7 | H&HP Complex (1,973); Lake Charles, Louisiana |
| December 16, 2018*; 2:00 pm, Chanticleer Sports Network | | at Coastal Carolina | L 65–69 | 4–8 | HTC Center (750); Conway, South Carolina |
| December 19, 2019*; 8:00 pm, FSMW/ESPN+ | | at Saint Louis | L 65–74 | 4–9 | Chaifetz Arena (6,678); St. Louis, Missouri |
| December 30, 2019*; 2:00 pm | | Wilberforce | W 91–44 | 5–9 | McDougald–McLendon Gymnasium (320); Durham, North Carolina |
MEAC regular season
| January 5, 2019; 4:00 pm | | Bethune–Cookman | W 68–59 | 6–9 (1–0) | McDougald–McLendon Gymnasium (1,057); Durham, North Carolina |
| January 12, 2019; 4:00 pm | | at Maryland Eastern Shore | W 61–48 | 7–9 (2–0) | Hytche Athletic Center (714); Princess Anne, Maryland |
| January 14, 2019; 7:30 pm | | at Delaware State | W 71–70 | 8–9 (3–0) | Memorial Hall (532); Dover, Delaware |
| January 19, 2019; 4:00 pm | | Coppin State | L 60–64 | 8–10 (3–1) | McDougald–McLendon Gymnasium (1,028); Durham, North Carolina |
| January 21, 2019; 4:00 pm | | Morgan State | W 92–64 | 9–10 (4–1) | McDougald–McLendon Gymnasium (1,171); Durham, North Carolina |
| January 26, 2019; 4:00 pm | | North Carolina A&T | L 48–51 | 9–11 (4–2) | McDougald–McLendon Gymnasium (3,043); Durham, North Carolina |
| January 28, 2019; 7:30 pm | | at Savannah State | W 82–78 | 10–11 (5–2) | Tiger Arena (2,105); Savannah, Georgia |
| February 2, 2019; 4:00 pm | | at Bethune-Cookman | L 64–74 | 10–12 (5–3) | Moore Gymnasium (699); Daytona Beach, Florida |
| February 4, 2019; 8:00 pm | | at Florida A&M | L 57–73 | 10–13 (5–4) | Teaching Gym (5,317); Tallahassee, Florida |
| February 9, 2019; 4:00 pm | | Maryland Eastern Shore | W 78–53 | 11–13 (6–4) | McDougald–McLendon Gymnasium (1,622); Durham, North Carolina |
| February 11, 2019; 7:30 pm | | Delaware State | W 87–52 | 12–13 (7–4) | McDougald–McLendon Gymnasium (1,341); Durham, North Carolina |
| February 16, 2019; 6:30 pm | | at Norfolk State | L 71–75 ^{OT} | 12–14 (7–5) | Joseph G. Echols Memorial Hall (3,868); Norfolk, Virginia |
| February 18, 2019; 8:00 pm | | at Howard | W 98–90 | 13–14 (8–5) | Burr Gymnasium (2,607); Washington, D.C. |
| February 23, 2019; 4:00 pm | | Savannah State | W 78–69 | 14–14 (9–5) | McDougald–McLendon Gymnasium (1,412); Durham, North Carolina |
| February 25, 2019; 7:00 pm | | South Carolina State | W 72–62 | 15–14 (10–5) | McDougald–McLendon Gymnasium (1,686); Durham, North Carolina |
| March 7, 2019; 7:30 pm | | at North Carolina A&T | L 52–74 | 15–15 (10–6) | Corbett Sports Center (3,235); Greensboro, North Carolina |
MEAC tournament
| March 14, 2019; 6:00 pm, FloSports | (3) | vs. (11) Delaware State; Quarterfinals | W 75–57 | 16–15 | Norfolk Scope; Norfolk, Virginia |
| March 15, 2019; 8:00 pm, FloSports | (3) | vs. (2) North Carolina A&T; Semifinals | W 65–63 | 17–15 | Norfolk Scope; Norfolk, Virginia |
| March 16, 2019; 1:00 pm, ESPN2 | (3) | vs. (1) Norfolk State; Championship | W 50–47 | 18–15 | Norfolk Scope; Norfolk, Virginia |
NCAA tournament
| March 19, 2019*; 6:40 pm, truTV | (16 E) | vs. (16 E) North Dakota State; First Four | L 74–78 | 18–16 | UD Arena (11,827); Dayton, OH |
*Non-conference game. ^{#}Rankings from AP Poll. (#) Tournament seedings in parentheses. All times are in Eastern.
