= 2018–19 Delaware State Hornets men's basketball team =

American college basketball season

2018–19 Delaware State Hornets men's basketball
- Conference: Mid-Eastern Athletic Conference
- Record: 6–25 (2–14 MEAC)
- Head coach: Eric Skeeters (1st season)
- Assistant coaches: Keith Goodie; Kevin McClain; Stephen Stewart
- Home arena: Memorial Hall

2018–19 MEAC men's basketball standings
	Conf.				Overall
Team	W		L	PCT	W		L	PCT
Norfolk State	14	–	2	.875	22	–	14	.611
North Carolina A&T	13	–	3	.813	19	–	13	.594
North Carolina Central †	10	–	6	.625	18	–	16	.529
Howard	10	–	6	.625	17	–	17	.500
Bethune–Cookman	9	–	7	.563	14	–	17	.452
Florida A&M*	9	–	7	.563	12	–	19	.387
Savannah State	8	–	8	.500	11	–	20	.355
Coppin State	7	–	9	.438	8	–	25	.242
MD Eastern Shore	5	–	11	.313	7	–	25	.219
South Carolina State	5	–	11	.313	8	–	26	.235
Morgan State	4	–	12	.250	9	–	21	.300
Delaware State	2	–	14	.125	6	–	25	.194
† 2019 MEAC tournament winner *ineligible for postseason due to APR violations

The 2018–19 Delaware State Hornets men's basketball team represented Delaware State University in the 2018–19 NCAA Division I men's basketball season. They played their home games at Memorial Hall in Dover, Delaware, and were led by 1st-year head coach Eric Skeeters.

== Previous season ==
The Hornets finished the 2017–18 season 4–28, 2–14 in the MEAC play to finish in last place. They lost in the first round of the MEAC tournament to North Carolina A&T. They lost every game on the road and on a neutral court, with both of their non-conference victories coming against non-Division I schools. They had the dubious distinction of finishing the season 351st in RPI out of the 351 teams in the NCAA.

On February 22, 2018, head coach Keith Walker was fired and associate head coach Keith Johnson was named interim head coach for the remainder of the season. On July 26, 5 months after Walker was fired, the school hired UMBC assistant Eric Skeeters for the head coaching job.

== Roster ==
2018–19 Delaware State Hornets men's basketball team
Players
Coaches

Pos.	#	Name	Height	Weight	Year	Previous school	Hometown
PG	0	Justin Ryder	6 ft 0 in (1.83 m)	175 lb (79 kg)	Fr	Paul VI	Blackwood, NJ
G	2	Kevin Larkin	6 ft 5 in (1.96 m)	175 lb (79 kg)	Sr	Sussex Tech HS	Georgetown, DE
G	3	Montrell Horsey	6 ft 1 in (1.85 m)	175 lb (79 kg)	Fr	Joppatowne	Edgewood, MD
PG	4	Johquin "Pinky" Wiley	5 ft 11 in (1.8 m)	175 lb (79 kg)	So	Chesterfield	Chesterfield, VA
G	5	Jon Mitchell	6 ft 4 in (1.93 m)	210 lb (95 kg)	Sr	San Jacinto College	Waterbury, CT
F	10	Ronald Lucas	6 ft 6 in (1.98 m)	190 lb (86 kg)	Fr	Reach Partnership	Baltimore, MD
F/C	13	Fahim Jenneto	6 ft 7 in (2.01 m)	230 lb (104 kg)	Fr	Thornlea Secondary School	Ajax, ON
F	15	Ameer Bennett	6 ft 8 in (2.03 m)	220 lb (100 kg)	So	St. Christopher's	Richmond, VA
G	21	Saleik Edwards	6 ft 3 in (1.91 m)	210 lb (95 kg)	Sr	Brunswick CC	Winterville, NC
G	23	Jordan Bushrod	6 ft 4 in (1.93 m)	190 lb (86 kg)	So	Fork Union Military Academy	Fort Washington, MD
G	32	Myles Carter	6 ft 1 in (1.85 m)	170 lb (77 kg)	So	Palumbo	Philadelphia, PA

Head coach

- Eric Skeeters (Coppin State)

Assistant coach(es)

- Keith Goodie (Morgan State)
- Kevin McClain (America)
- Stephen Stewart (Coppin State)

Legend

- (C) Team captain
- (S) Suspended
- (I) Ineligible
- (W) Walk-on
- Injured
- Current redshirt

Roster
Last update: January 1, 2019

== Schedule and results ==
Date time, TV	Rank^{#}	Opponent^{#}	Result	Record	Site (attendance) city, state
Non-conference regular season
November 6, 2018*; 7:45 pm		at East Carolina	L 56–81	0–1	Williams Arena at Minges Coliseum (3,773); Greenville, SC
November 10, 2018*; 9:00 pm		at Grand Canyon	L 47–89	0–2	GCU Arena (7,122); Phoenix, AZ
November 13, 2018*; 7:00 pm		at Loyola (MD)	L 62–91	0–3	Reitz Arena (914); Baltimore, MD
November 16, 2018*; 2:00 pm		at Longwood	L 73–89	0–4	Willett Hall (1,798); Farmville, VA
November 19, 2018*; 7:00 pm		Saint Elizabeth	W 80–47	1–4	Memorial Hall (727); Dover, DE
November 24, 2018*; 10:30 pm		at Washington State	L 52–80	1–5	Beasley Coliseum (1,203); Pullman, WA
November 27, 2018*; 7:30 pm		Penn	L 48–76	1–6	Memorial Hall (757); Dover, DE
December 1, 2018*; 4:00 pm		at St. Bonaventure	L 61–90	1–7	Reilly Center (3,864); Olean, NY
December 3, 2018*; 7:30 pm		Cairn	W 102–66	2–7	Memorial Hall (572); Dover, DE
December 8, 2018*; 5:30 pm		Jacksonville State	L 54–81	2–8	Memorial Hall (617); Dover, DE
December 19, 2018*; 7:00 pm		at Delaware; Route 1 Rivalry	W 73–71	3–8	Bob Carpenter Center (1,533); Newark, DE
December 22, 2018*; 4:00 pm		at Weber State	L 69–83	3–9	Dee Events Center (5,711); Ogden, UT
December 29, 2018*; 2:00 pm		at Ball State	L 57–116	3–10	Worthen Arena (3,424); Muncie, IN
MEAC regular season
January 5, 2019; 4:00 pm		at Norfolk State	L 63–77	3–11 (0–1)	Joseph G. Echols Memorial Hall (1,669); Norfolk, VA
January 7, 2019; 7:30 pm		Coppin State	L 60–64	3–12 (0–2)	Memorial Hall (954); Dover, DE
January 12, 2019; 4:00 pm		North Carolina A&T	L 70–93	3–13 (0–3)	Memorial Hall (560); Dover, DE
January 14, 2019; 7:30 pm		North Carolina Central	L 70–71	3–14 (0–4)	Memorial Hall (532); Dover, DE
January 19, 2019; 4:00 pm		at Bethune–Cookman	L 49–69	3–15 (0–5)	Moore Gymnasium (801); Daytona Beach, FL
January 21, 2019; 8:30 pm		at Florida A&M	L 47–60	3–16 (0–6)	Teaching Gym (1,648); Tallahassee, FL
January 26, 2019; 4:00 pm		at Howard	L 74–80	3–17 (0–7)	Burr Gymnasium (1,429); Washington, D.C.
February 2, 2019; 4:00 pm		Savannah State	L 73–76	3–18 (0–8)	Memorial Hall (523); Dover, DE
February 4, 2019; 7:30 pm		South Carolina State	W 70–68	4–18 (1–8)	Memorial Hall (584); Dover, DE
February 9, 2019; 4:00 pm		at North Carolina A&T	L 52–82	4–19 (1–9)	Corbett Sports Center (1,904); Greensboro, NC
February 11, 2019; 7:30 pm		at North Carolina Central	L 52–87	4–20 (1–10)	McDougald–McLendon Gymnasium (1,341); Durham, NC
February 23, 2019; 4:00 pm		Maryland Eastern Shore	L 56–62	4–21 (1–11)	Memorial Hall (1,087); Dover, DE
February 25, 2019; 7:30 pm		at Coppin State	W 70–60	5–21 (2–12)	Physical Education Complex (519); Baltimore, MD
March 2, 2019; 4:00 pm		Morgan State	L 58–76	5–22 (2–13)	Memorial Hall (819); Dover, DE
March 4, 2019; 7:30 pm		Norfolk State	L 66–74	5–23 (2–14)	Memorial Hall (974); Dover, DE
March 7, 2019; 7:30 pm		at Maryland Eastern Shore	L 64–70	5–24 (2–15)	Hytche Athletic Center (2,091); Princess Anne, MD
MEAC tournament
March 11, 2019; 6:00 pm	(11)	vs. (6) Savannah State; First round	W 71–67	6–24	Norfolk Scope; Norfolk, VA
March 14, 2019; 6:00 pm	(11)	vs. (3) North Carolina Central; Quarterfinals	L 57–75	6–25	Norfolk Scope; Norfolk, VA
*Non-conference game. ^{#}Rankings from AP Poll. (#) Tournament seedings in parentheses. All times are in Eastern.
