= 2018–19 Howard Bison men's basketball team =

American college basketball season

2018–19 Howard Bison men's basketball

CBI, First Round
- Conference: Mid-Eastern Athletic Conference
- Record: 17–17 (10–6 MEAC)
- Head coach: Kevin Nickelberry (9th season)
- Assistant coaches: Keith Coutreyer; Sean Whalen; Jordan Brooks
- Home arena: Burr Gymnasium

2018–19 MEAC men's basketball standings
	Conf.				Overall
Team	W		L	PCT	W		L	PCT
Norfolk State	14	–	2	.875	22	–	14	.611
North Carolina A&T	13	–	3	.813	19	–	13	.594
North Carolina Central †	10	–	6	.625	18	–	16	.529
Howard	10	–	6	.625	17	–	17	.500
Bethune–Cookman	9	–	7	.563	14	–	17	.452
Florida A&M*	9	–	7	.563	12	–	19	.387
Savannah State	8	–	8	.500	11	–	20	.355
Coppin State	7	–	9	.438	8	–	25	.242
MD Eastern Shore	5	–	11	.313	7	–	25	.219
South Carolina State	5	–	11	.313	8	–	26	.235
Morgan State	4	–	12	.250	9	–	21	.300
Delaware State	2	–	14	.125	6	–	25	.194
† 2019 MEAC tournament winner *ineligible for postseason due to APR violations

The 2018–19 Howard Bison men's basketball team represented Howard University during the 2018–19 NCAA Division I men's basketball season. The Bison, led by ninth-year head coach Kevin Nickelberry, played their home games at Burr Gymnasium in Washington, D.C. as members of the Mid-Eastern Athletic Conference. They finished the season 17-17, 10-6 in MEAC play to finish in a tie for third place. They defeated Bethune-Cookman in the quarterfinals of the MEAC tournament before losing in the semifinals to Norfolk State. They received an at-large bid to the College Basketball Invitational, where they lost in the first round to Coastal Carolina.

== Departures ==
- Kai Tease
- Ibrahim Dosunmu
- Michael Obindu
- Henry Odunze

== Transfers ==
- Phillip Jones

== Roster ==
2018–19 Howard Bison men's basketball team
Players
Coaches

Pos.	#	Name	Height	Weight	Year	Hometown
G	0	Langston Gaither	6 ft 4 in (1.93 m)	197 lb (89 kg)	Fr	Alexandria, Virginia
G	1	Andre Toure	6 ft 8 in (2.03 m)	195 lb (88 kg)	Fr	Paris, France
G	2	R. J. Cole	6 ft 1 in (1.85 m)	175 lb (79 kg)	So	Union, New Jersey
G	3	Nate Garvey	6 ft 4 in (1.93 m)	225 lb (102 kg)	RS So	Nanuet, New York
G	4	Raymond Bethea, Jr.	6 ft 6 in (1.98 m)	185 lb (84 kg)	Fr	Atlantic City, New Jersey
F	5	Marcus Hall	6 ft 7 in (2.01 m)	220 lb (100 kg)	RS Jr	Atlanta, Georgia
F	10	Zion Cousins	6 ft 7 in (2.01 m)	185 lb (84 kg)	So	Upper Marlboro, Maryland
G	11	Kyle Foster	6 ft 5 in (1.96 m)	165 lb (75 kg)	So	Hampton, Virginia
G	12	Akuwovo Ogheneyole	6 ft 9 in (2.06 m)	215 lb (98 kg)	Fr	Asaba, Nigeria
G/F	13	Charles Williams	6 ft 4 in (1.93 m)	185 lb (84 kg)	Jr	Richmond, Virginia
G	15	Philip Jones	6 ft 1 in (1.85 m)	175 lb (79 kg)	Jr	Atlanta, Georgia
G	20	Michael Barber	6 ft 9 in (2.06 m)	225 lb (102 kg)	Fr	Jackson, Mississippi
G	21	Chad Lott	6 ft 4 in (1.93 m)	185 lb (84 kg)	RS Jr	Shreveport, Louisiana
F	23	Jalen Jones	6 ft 5 in (1.96 m)	200 lb (91 kg)	RS Sr	Kinston, North Carolina
G	24	Justin Cotten	5 ft 11 in (1.8 m)	180 lb (82 kg)	Sr	Clinton, Maryland
F/C	25	Cameron Lewis	6 ft 8 in (2.03 m)	235 lb (107 kg)	Sr	Buffalo, New York
C	35	Princewill Anosike	6 ft 9 in (2.06 m)	225 lb (102 kg)	RS Fr	Lagos, Nigeria

Head coach

- Kevin Nickelberry (Virginia Wesleyan)

Assistant coach(es)

- Keith Coutreyer (Washington Adventist)
- Sean Whalen
- Jordan Brooks (Hampton)

Legend

- (C) Team captain
- (S) Suspended
- (I) Ineligible
- (W) Walk-on
- Injured
- Current redshirt

Roster
Last update: December 24, 2018

== Schedule ==
Date time, TV	Rank^{#}	Opponent^{#}	Result	Record	High points	High rebounds	High assists	Site (attendance) city, state
Non-conference regular season
November 7, 2018*; 7:00 pm		Washington Adventist	W 115–91	1–0	27 – Lott	8 – Cousins	8 – Cole	Burr Gymnasium (1,647); Washington, DC
November 11, 2018*; 4:00 pm		Central Penn; Military Appreciation Night	W 99–71	2–0	24 – Williams	7 – Ogheneyole	8 – Cole	Burr Gymnasium (1,264); Washington, DC
November 13, 2018*; 7:00 pm		Regent	W 108–51	3–0	20 – Cole	7 – Cole	8 – Ogheneyole	Burr Gymnasium (1,091); Washington, DC
November 16, 2018*; 7:00 pm, ESPN+		at UMass; Las Vegas Invitational campus game	W 68–63	4–0	19 – Williams	14 – Ogheneyole	7 – Cole	Mullins Center (2,048); Amherst, MA
November 19, 2018*; 7:00 pm, ESPN+		at Southern Illinois; Las Vegas Invitational campus game	L 69–83	4–1	30 – Williams	9 – Cole	7 – Cousins	SIU Arena (3,720); Carbondale, IL
November 23, 2018*; 3:30 pm		at Little Rock; Las Vegas Holiday Invitational regional semifinals	L 76–97	4–2	26 – Cole	3 – Cole	5 – Toure	Jack Stephens Center (1,448); Little Rock, AR
November 24, 2018*; 2:00 pm		vs. California Baptist; Las Vegas Holiday Invitational regional 3rd place game	W 86–84	5–2	31 – Cole	5 – Cole	6 – Cousins	Jack Stephens Center; Little Rock, AR
December 4, 2018*; 7:00 pm, ESPN+		at Appalachian State	L 86–100	5–3	19 – Williams	6 – Cole	7 – Anosike	Holmes Dome (603); Boone, NC
December 8, 2018*; 7:00 pm		American	W 85–83	6–3	24 – Lott	12 – Cousins	10 – Cole	Burr Gymnasium (1,823); Washington, DC
December 14, 2018*; 7:00 pm, ESPN+		at George Washington	L 64–70	6–4	15 – Cole	7 – Cole	12 – Cousins	Smith Center (2,630); Washington, DC
December 16, 2018*; 2:00 pm, ESPN+		at Fordham	L 67–74	6–5	18 – Cole	7 – Williams	5 – Cole	Rose Hill Gymnasium (1,907); The Bronx, NY
December 20, 2018*; 7:00 pm, ESPN+		at Ball State	L 71–98	6–6	14 – Williams	9 – Anosike	8 – Cole	Worthen Arena (3,324); Muncie, IN
December 22, 2018*; 5:00 pm, Monumental SN		vs. Hampton; DC Holiday HoopsFest	L 82–89	6–7	29 – Cole	13 – Cousins	6 – Cole	St. Elizabeth's Arena (1,050); Washington, DC
December 29, 2018*; 12:00 pm, FS1		at Georgetown; DC Holiday Hoopsfest	L 67–102	6–8	28 – Cole	9 – Cousins	6 – Cole	Capital One Arena (7,519); Washington, DC
MEAC regular season
January 5, 2019; 4:00 pm, Monumental SN		Florida A&M	L 72–82	6–9 (0–1)	25 – Williams	7 – Lott	3 – Cole	Burr Gymnasium (1,187); Washington, DC
January 7, 2019; 7:30 pm		at MD Eastern Shore	W 73–39	7–9 (1–1)	26 – Cole	13 – Cousins	5 – Cole	Hytche Athletic Center (532); Princess Anne, MD
January 12, 2019; 4:00 pm		Bethune–Cookman	L 63–71	7–10 (1–2)	20 – Cole	12 – Cousins	5 – Cole	Burr Gymnasium (896); Washington D.C.
January 15, 2019; 7:30 pm		Morgan State	L 86–89 ^{OT}	7–11 (1–3)	25 – Williams	10 – Toure	6 – Cole	Burr Gymnasium (2,153); Washington D.C.
January 19, 2019; 4:00 pm		at South Carolina State	W 71–67 ^{OT}	8–11 (2–3)	26 – Cole	6 – Lott	6 – Cole	SHM Memorial Center; Orangeburg, SC
January 21, 2019*; 1:00 pm		Harvard	L 71–84	8–12	21 – Cole	11 – Cousins	8 – Cole	Burr Gymnasium (2,523); Washington D.C.
January 26, 2019; 4:00 pm		Delaware State	W 80–74	9–12 (3–3)	30 – Williams	8 – Cousins	6 – Lott	Burr Gymnasium (1,849); Washington D.C.
January 28, 2019; 7:00 pm, ESPNU		MD Eastern Shore	W 72–57	10–12 (4–3)	21 – Williams	7 – Toure	8 – Cole	Burr Gymnasium (1,078); Washington, D.C.
February 2, 2019; 4:00 pm		Norfolk State	L 78–80	10–13 (4–4)	29 – Cole	9 – Lott	6 – Cole	Burr Gymnasium (2,284); Washington D.C.
February 9, 2019; 4:00 pm		at Florida A&M	W 70–66	11–13 (5–4)	20 – Cole	7 – Cousins	7 – Cole	Teaching Gym (1,911); Tallahassee, FL
February 11, 2019; 7:30 pm, FloHoops.com		at Bethune–Cookman	W 79–73	12–13 (6–4)	32 – Cole	10 – Ogheneyole	6 – Cole	Moore Gymnasium (901); Daytona Beach, FL
February 16, 2019; 4:00 pm		North Carolina A&T	L 81–85	12–14 (6–5)	20 – Cole	8 – Ogheneyole	6 – Cole	Burr Gymnasium (2,597); Washington, D.C.
February 18, 2019; 7:30 pm		North Carolina Central	L 90–98	12–15 (6–6)	26 – Cole	4 – Cole	5 – Cole	Burr Gymnasium (2,607); Washington, D.C.
February 23, 2019; 4:00 pm		at Coppin State	W 74–73	13–15 (7–6)	19 – Cole	12 – Cousins	7 – Cole	Physical Education Complex (2000); Baltimore, MD
February 25, 2019; 7:30 pm		at Morgan State	W 75–69	14–15 (8–6)	19 – Cole	7 – Lott	4 – Cole	Talmadge L. Hill Field House (3,510); Baltimore, MD
March 2, 2019; 6:00 pm		at Savannah State	W 81–76	15–15 (9–6)	23 – Cole	10 – Lott	5 – Cole	Tiger Arena (2,000); Savannah, GA
March 7, 2019; 8:00 pm		at Norfolk State	W 98–95	16–15 (10–6)	36 – Cole	7 – Ogheneyole	7 – Cole	Joseph G. Echols Memorial Hall (2,469); Norfolk, VA
MEAC tournament
March 14, 2019; 8:00 pm, ESPN3	(4)	vs. (5) Bethune–Cookman; Quarterfinals	W 80–71	17–15	23 – Cole	8 – Cousins	9 – Cole	Norfolk Scope; Norfolk, VA
March 14, 2019; 8:00 pm, ESPN3	(4)	vs. (1) Norfolk State; Semifinals	L 69–75	17–16	21 – Lott	7 – Cousins	7 – Cole	Norfolk Scope; Norfolk, VA
College Basketball Invitational
March 20, 2019*; 7:00 pm, ESPN+		at Coastal Carolina; First Round	L 72–81	17–17	17 – Williams	12 – Cole	8 – Cole	HTC Center (779); Conway, SC
*Non-conference game. ^{#}Rankings from AP Poll. (#) Tournament seedings in parentheses.
