= 2018–19 South Carolina State Bulldogs basketball team =

American college basketball season

2018–19 South Carolina State Bulldogs basketball
- Conference: Mid-Eastern Athletic Conference
- Record: 8–26 (5–11 MEAC)
- Head coach: Murray Garvin (6th season)
- Assistant coaches: Rio Pitt; Bobby Collins
- Home arena: SHM Memorial Center

2018–19 MEAC men's basketball standings
	Conf.				Overall
Team	W		L	PCT	W		L	PCT
Norfolk State	14	–	2	.875	22	–	14	.611
North Carolina A&T	13	–	3	.813	19	–	13	.594
North Carolina Central †	10	–	6	.625	18	–	16	.529
Howard	10	–	6	.625	17	–	17	.500
Bethune–Cookman	9	–	7	.563	14	–	17	.452
Florida A&M*	9	–	7	.563	12	–	19	.387
Savannah State	8	–	8	.500	11	–	20	.355
Coppin State	7	–	9	.438	8	–	25	.242
MD Eastern Shore	5	–	11	.313	7	–	25	.219
South Carolina State	5	–	11	.313	8	–	26	.235
Morgan State	4	–	12	.250	9	–	21	.300
Delaware State	2	–	14	.125	6	–	25	.194
† 2019 MEAC tournament winner *ineligible for postseason due to APR violations

The 2018–19 South Carolina State Bulldogs basketball team represented South Carolina State University in the 2018–19 NCAA Division I men's basketball season. They were led by 6th-year head coach Murray Garvin, and played their home games at SHM Memorial Center in Orangeburg, South Carolina as member of the Mid-Eastern Athletic Conference (MEAC).

The Bulldogs finished the season 8–26 overall, 5–11 in MEAC play, finishing in a tie for ninth place. In the MEAC tournament, they defeated Maryland Eastern Shore in the first round before falling to top-seeded Norfolk State in the quarterfinals.

== Previous season ==
The Bulldogs finished the 2017–18 season 10–22, 6–10 in MEAC play, to finish in tenth place. They lost to Morgan State in the first round of the MEAC tournament.

== Roster ==
2018–19 South Carolina State Bulldogs men's basketball team
Players
Coaches

Pos.	#	Name	Height	Weight	Year	Previous school	Hometown
G/F	0	Lavar Harewood	6 ft 3 in (1.91 m)	—	RS Jr	Cloud County CC	Brooklyn, NY
F	1	Aramani Hill	6 ft 7 in (2.01 m)	—	So	Spartanburg Methodist	Rock Hill, SC
G	2	Fahmmi Mamo	6 ft 6 in (1.98 m)	—	Fr	Carolina Basketball Academy	Alexandria, VA
G	3	Rayshawn Neal	5 ft 10 in (1.78 m)	—	So	Legacy Charter	Greenville, SC
G	4	Dwayne Banks	5 ft 10 in (1.78 m)	—	RS Jr	Elizabeth City State	Baltimore, MD
F	5	Ozante Fields	6 ft 7 in (2.01 m)	—	Jr	Denmark-Olar	Denmark, SC
G	10	Allen Jr. Hatchett	6 ft 4 in (1.93 m)	—	Fr	White Station	Memphis, TN
G	11	Janai Raynor-Powell	5 ft 10 in (1.78 m)	—	Sr	Denmark Tech CC	Virginia Beach, VA
G	14	Jahmari Etienne	6 ft 3 in (1.91 m)	—	Jr	East Georgia CC	Atlanta, GA
G	20	Robert Flint	6 ft 2 in (1.88 m)	—	RS Jr	Greenville Senior	Greenville, SC
F	21	David Bottenberg	6 ft 8 in (2.03 m)	—	Jr	Millbrook School	Rockville, MD
G	22	Fred Slater	6 ft 4 in (1.93 m)	—	So	Spartanburg Methodist	Centreville, VA
F	24	Ian Kinard	6 ft 8 in (2.03 m)	—	Jr	Grey Collegiate Academy	Clinton, SC
F	35	Damani Applewhite	6 ft 8 in (2.03 m)	—	Jr	Westover	Fayetteville, NC

Head coach

- Murray Garvin (Eastern Kentucky)

Assistant coach(es)

- Rio Pitt (South Carolina State)
- Bobby Collins (Eastern Kentucky)

Legend

- (C) Team captain
- (S) Suspended
- (I) Ineligible
- (W) Walk-on
- Injured
- Current redshirt

Roster
Last update: August 10, 2025

== Schedule and results ==
Date time, TV	Rank^{#}	Opponent^{#}	Result	Record	Site (attendance) city, state
Non-conference regular season
November 6, 2018*; 7:00 p.m.		Brevard College	W 99–51	1–0	SHM Memorial Center (432); Orangeburg, SC
November 10, 2018*; 3:30 p.m.		at Tulsa	L 52–74	1–1	Reynolds Center (3,251); Tulsa, OK
November 13, 2018*; 7:30 p.m., ESPN+		at Charleston Southern	L 72–89	1–2	CSU Field House (917); North Charleston, SC
November 16, 2018*; 7:00 p.m.		at Cleveland State; Buckeye Basketball Classic	L 69–84	1–3	Wolstein Center (1,071); Cleveland, OH
November 18, 2018*; 2:00 p.m.		at Ohio State; Buckeye Basketball Classic	L 61–89	1–4	Value City Arena (10,935); Columbus, OH
November 20, 2018*; 7:00 p.m.		at Purdue Fort Wayne; Buckeye Basketball Classic	L 68–72	1–5	Memorial Coliseum (1,330); Fort Wayne, IN
November 25, 2018*; 6:30 p.m., ESPN+		at Samford; Buckeye Basketball Classic	L 60–77	1–6	Pete Hanna Center (677); Homewood, AL
November 28, 2018*; 7:00 p.m.		at College of Charleston	L 70–83	1–7	TD Arena (4,167); Charleston, SC
December 1, 2018*; 6:00 p.m., ESPN+		at Jacksonville	L 69–71	1–8	Swisher Gymnasium (754); Jacksonville, FL
December 6, 2018*; 7:30 p.m.		Voorhees College	W 90–69	2–8	SHM Memorial Center; Orangeburg, SC
December 9, 2018*; 1:00 p.m., ACCN Extra		at Virginia Tech	L 44–81	2–9	Cassell Coliseum (5,305); Blacksburg, VA
December 11, 2018*; 7:00 p.m., ESPN+		at Liberty	L 55–79	2–10	Vines Center (1,684); Lynchburg, VA
December 15, 2018*; 4:00 p.m., ESPN+		at USC Upstate	L 84–88	2–11	G. B. Hodge Center (665); Spartanburg, SC
December 20, 2018*; 7:00 p.m.		at Miami (OH)	L 55–79	2–12	Millett Hall (1,223); Oxford, OH
December 22, 2018*; 2:00 p.m.		at Cincinnati	L 56–77	2–13	Fifth Third Arena (11,623); Cincinnati, OH
January 2, 2019*; 6:00 p.m.		Presbyterian	L 70–72	2–14	SHM Memorial Center (249); Orangeburg, SC
MEAC regular season
January 5, 2019; 4:00 p.m.		North Carolina A&T	L 77–80	2–15 (0–1)	SHM Memorial Center (356); Orangeburg, SC
January 12, 2019; 4:00 p.m.		at Morgan State	W 72–68	3–15 (1–1)	Talmadge L. Hill Field House; Baltimore, MD
January 14, 2019; 7:30 p.m.		at Coppin State	W 70–68	4–15 (2–1)	Physical Education Complex; Baltimore, MD
January 19, 2019; 4:00 p.m.		Howard	L 67–71	4–16 (2–2)	SHM Memorial Center; Orangeburg, SC
January 21, 2019; 7:30 p.m.		Norfolk State	L 69–74	4–17 (2–3)	SHM Memorial Center; Orangeburg, SC
January 26, 2019; 4:00 p.m.		at Savannah State	L 88–92	4–18 (2–4)	Tiger Arena; Savannah, GA
February 2, 2019; 4:00 p.m.		at Maryland Eastern Shore	L 61–63	4–19 (2–5)	Hytche Athletic Center; Princess Anne, MD
February 4, 2019; 7:30 p.m.		at Delaware State	L 68–70	4–20 (2–6)	Memorial Hall; Dover, DE
February 9, 2019; 4:00 p.m.		Morgan State	W 85–81	5–20 (3–6)	SHM Memorial Center; Orangeburg, SC
February 11, 2019; 7:30 p.m.		Coppin State	W 85–84	6–20 (4–6)	SHM Memorial Center; Orangeburg, SC
February 16, 2019; 4:00 p.m.		Bethune–Cookman	L 73–98	6–21 (4–7)	SHM Memorial Center; Orangeburg, SC
February 18, 2019; 7:30 p.m.		Florida A&M	W 57–54	7–21 (5–7)	SHM Memorial Center; Orangeburg, SC
February 23, 2019; 4:00 p.m.		at North Carolina A&T	L 62–63	7–22 (5–8)	Corbett Sports Center; Greensboro, NC
February 25, 2019; 7:30 p.m., ESPNU		at North Carolina Central	L 62–72	7–23 (5–9)	McDougald–McLendon Gymnasium; Durham, NC
March 2, 2019; 4:00 p.m.		at Bethune–Cookman	L 95–98	7–24 (5–10)	Moore Gymnasium; Daytona Beach, FL
March 7, 2019; 7:30 p.m.		Savannah State	L 87–90	7–25 (5–11)	SHM Memorial Center; Orangeburg, SC
MEAC tournament
March 12, 2019; 6:00 p.m.	(9)	vs. (8) Maryland Eastern Shore; First round	W 63–54	8–25	Norfolk Scope; Norfolk, VA
March 13, 2019; 6:00 p.m.	(9)	vs. (1) Norfolk State; Quarterfinals	L 73–78	8–26	Norfolk Scope; Norfolk, VA
*Non-conference game. ^{#}Rankings from AP poll. (#) Tournament seedings in parentheses. All times are in Eastern.
