= 2018–19 Maryland Eastern Shore Hawks men's basketball team =

American college basketball season

2018–19 Maryland Eastern Shore Hawks men's basketball
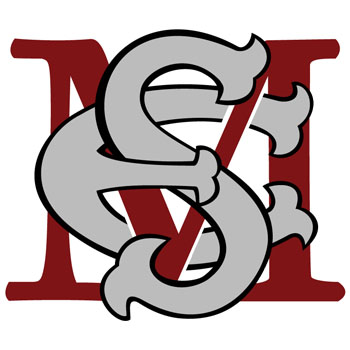
- Conference: Mid-Eastern Athletic Conference
- Record: 7–25 (5–11 MEAC)
- Head coach: Clifford Reed (interim, 1st season)
- Assistant coaches: Ace Custis; Raheem Waller
- Home arena: Hytche Athletic Center

2018–19 MEAC men's basketball standings
	Conf.				Overall
Team	W		L	PCT	W		L	PCT
Norfolk State	14	–	2	.875	22	–	14	.611
North Carolina A&T	13	–	3	.813	19	–	13	.594
North Carolina Central †	10	–	6	.625	18	–	16	.529
Howard	10	–	6	.625	17	–	17	.500
Bethune–Cookman	9	–	7	.563	14	–	17	.452
Florida A&M*	9	–	7	.563	12	–	19	.387
Savannah State	8	–	8	.500	11	–	20	.355
Coppin State	7	–	9	.438	8	–	25	.242
MD Eastern Shore	5	–	11	.313	7	–	25	.219
South Carolina State	5	–	11	.313	8	–	26	.235
Morgan State	4	–	12	.250	9	–	21	.300
Delaware State	2	–	14	.125	6	–	25	.194
† 2019 MEAC tournament winner *ineligible for postseason due to APR violations

The 2018–19 Maryland Eastern Shore Hawks men's basketball team represented the University of Maryland Eastern Shore in the 2018–19 NCAA Division I men's basketball season. They played their home games at the Hytche Athletic Center in Princess Anne, Maryland, and were led by interim head coach Clifford Reed. The Hawks finished the season 7–25, 5–11 in MEAC play to finish in a tie for eighth place. As the No. 8 seed in the MEAC tournament, they lost in the first round to South Carolina State.

== Previous season ==
The Hawks finished the 2017–18 season 7-25, 3-13 in MEAC play to finish in 12th place. As the No. 12 seed in the MEAC tournament, they lost to Norfolk State in the first round.

On March 26, 2018, it was announced that head coach Bobby Collins' contract would not be renewed. He finished at UMES with a four-year record of 49–82. The school named assistant coach Clifford Reed interim head coach for the 2018–19 season.

== Roster ==
2018–19 Maryland Eastern Shore Hawks men's basketball team
Players
Coaches

Pos.	#	Name	Height	Weight	Year	Previous school	Hometown
F	0	Marlon Adams	6 ft 6 in (1.98 m)	220 lb (100 kg)	Jr	Gulf Coast State College	Middletown, NY
G	1	Ryan Andino	6 ft 2 in (1.88 m)	180 lb (82 kg)	GS	Fishburne Military School	Fort Lauderdale, FL
G	2	Derrick Green	6 ft 3 in (1.91 m)	200 lb (91 kg)	Jr	Howard College	Baltimore, MD
PG	3	Canaan Bartley	6 ft 1 in (1.85 m)	175 lb (79 kg)	So	St. Petersburg College	Miami, FL
G	4	Colen Gaynor	6 ft 5 in (1.96 m)	185 lb (84 kg)	RS So	Parkside	Berlin, MD
F	10	Montraz Oliver	6 ft 3 in (1.91 m)	160 lb (73 kg)	RS So	Washington HS (MD)	Princess Anne, MD
G	11	Ahmad Frost	6 ft 0 in (1.83 m)	185 lb (84 kg)	RS Jr	Fishburne Military School	Cincinnati, OH
F	12	AJ Cheeseman	6 ft 7 in (2.01 m)	225 lb (102 kg)	Jr	Gordon State College	Snellville, GA
PG	13	Bryan Urrutia	6 ft 1 in (1.85 m)	206 lb (93 kg)	Jr	Cochise College	Chihuahua, Mexico
F	15	Tyler Jones	6 ft 7 in (2.01 m)	200 lb (91 kg)	Jr	Holy Spirit	Atlantic City, NJ
G	20	Dontae Caldwell	6 ft 5 in (1.96 m)	205 lb (93 kg)	RS Jr	Bull City Prep (NC)	Santa Ana, CA
G	22	Gabriel Gyamfi	6 ft 6 in (1.98 m)	185 lb (84 kg)	Jr	Maryland	Brampton, ON
G/F	24	Justice Bartley	6 ft 6 in (1.98 m)	204 lb (93 kg)	GS	Virginia	Lilburn, GA
F	35	Isaac Taylor	6 ft 8 in (2.03 m)	250 lb (113 kg)	RS Jr	Montrose Christian School	Wachapreague, VA

Head coach

- Clifford Reed (Bethune–Cookman)

Assistant coach(es)

- Ace Custis (Virginia Tech)
- Raheem Waller (South Carolina State)

Legend

- (C) Team captain
- (S) Suspended
- (I) Ineligible
- (W) Walk-on
- Injured
- Current redshirt

Roster
Last update: January 13, 2019

== Schedule and results ==
Date time, TV	Rank^{#}	Opponent^{#}	Result	Record	Site (attendance) city, state
Exhibition
November 1, 2018*; 8:00 pm		at Salisbury	L 60–67		Wicomico Youth and Civic Center (1,458); Salisbury, Maryland
Non-conference regular season
November 6, 2018*; 8:30 pm		at Georgetown	L 53–68	0–1	Capital One Arena (4,189); Washington, D.C.
November 10, 2018*; 12:00 pm		at NC State; Wolfpack Classic	L 49–95	0–2	PNC Arena (13,586); Raleigh, North Carolina
November 13, 2018*; 7:00 pm		Longwood	L 63–66	0–3	Hytche Athletic Center (1,115); Princess Anne, Maryland
November 17, 2018*; 6:00 pm		at North Texas; Wolfpack Classic	L 34–68	0–4	The Super Pit (2,226); Denton, Texas
November 20, 2018*; 7:00 pm		at Mercer; Wolfpack Classic	L 42–80	0–5	Hawkins Arena (2,589); Macon, Georgia
November 24, 2018*; 4:00 pm		Central Penn; Wolfpack Classic	W 77–52	1–5	Hytche Athletic Center (361); Princess Anne, Maryland
November 27, 2018*; 6:30 pm		at St. John's	L 64–85	1–6	Carnesecca Arena (4,727); Queens, New York
November 30, 2018*; 7:00 pm		Delaware	L 62–71	1–7	Hytche Athletic Center (1,428); Princess Anne, Maryland
December 2, 2018*; 4:00 pm		at East Carolina	L 47–70	1–8	Williams Arena at Minges Coliseum (2,964); Greenville, North Carolina
December 13, 2018*; 7:00 pm		at Duquesne	L 57–72	1–9	Palumbo Center (1,346); Pittsburgh, Pennsylvania
December 15, 2018*; 2:00 pm		at Pittsburgh	L 43–78	1–10	Petersen Events Center (4,472); Pittsburgh, Pennsylvania
December 20, 2018*; 11:00 am		at Winthrop	L 74–88	1–11	Winthrop Coliseum (5,103); Rock Hill, South Carolina
December 22, 2018*; 12:00 pm		at American	L 58–82	1–12	Bender Arena (1,330); Washington, D.C.
December 28, 2018*; 7:00 pm		at No. 10 Virginia Tech	L 40–85	1–13	Cassell Coliseum (7,632); Blacksburg, Virginia
December 31, 2018*; 1:00 pm		Chestnut Hill	W 68–62	2–13	Hytche Athletic Center (318); Princess Anne, Maryland
MEAC regular season
January 5, 2019; 4:00 pm		at Morgan State	L 53–66	2–14 (0–1)	Talmadge L. Hill Field House (489); Baltimore, Maryland
January 7, 2019; 7:30 pm		Howard	L 39–79	2–15 (0–2)	Hytche Athletic Center (532); Princess Anne, Maryland
January 12, 2019; 4:00 pm		North Carolina Central	L 48–61	2–16 (0–3)	Hytche Athletic Center (714); Princess Anne, Maryland
January 14, 2019; 7:30 pm		North Carolina A&T	L 58–67	2–17 (0–4)	Hytche Athletic Center (842); Princess Anne, Maryland
January 19, 2019; 4:00 pm		at Florida A&M	W 60–58 ^{OT}	3–17 (1–4)	Teaching Gym (1,565); Tallahassee, Florida
January 21, 2019; 7:30 pm		at Bethune–Cookman	L 68–89	3–18 (1–5)	Moore Gymnasium (614); Daytona Beach, Florida
January 26, 2019; 6:30 pm		at Norfolk State	L 60–88	3–19 (1–6)	Joseph G. Echols Memorial Hall (3,184); Norfolk, Virginia
January 28, 2019; 7:30 pm, ESPNU		at Howard	L 57–72	3–20 (1–7)	Burr Gymnasium (1,078); Washington, D.C.
February 2, 2019; 4:00 pm		South Carolina State	W 63–61	4–20 (2–7)	Hytche Athletic Center (1,596); Princess Anne, Maryland
February 4, 2019; 7:30 pm		Savannah State	L 63–68	4–21 (2–8)	Hytche Athletic Center (2,026); Princess Anne, Maryland
February 9, 2019; 4:00 pm		at North Carolina Central	L 53–78	4–22 (2–9)	McDougald–McLendon Gymnasium (1,622); Durham, North Carolina
February 11, 2019; 7:30 pm		at North Carolina A&T	L 61–68	4–23 (2–10)	Corbett Sports Center (1,944); Greensboro, North Carolina
February 16, 2019; 4:00 pm		Coppin State	L 55–58	4–24 (2–11)	Hytche Athletic Center (4,637); Princess Anne, Maryland
February 23, 2019; 4:00 pm		at Delaware State	W 62–56	5–24 (3–11)	Memorial Hall (1,087); Dover, Delaware
March 4, 2019; 7:30 pm		Morgan State	W 78–73	6–24 (4–11)	Hytche Athletic Center (2,379); Princess Anne, Maryland
March 7, 2019; 7:30 pm		Delaware State	W 70–64	7–24 (5–11)	Hytche Athletic Center (2,091); Princess Anne, Maryland
MEAC tournament
March 12, 2019; 6:00 p.m.	(8)	vs. (9) South Carolina State; First round	L 54–63	7–25	Norfolk Scope; Norfolk, Virginia
*Non-conference game. ^{#}Rankings from AP Poll. (#) Tournament seedings in parentheses. All times are in Eastern.
