= 2018–19 Bethune–Cookman Wildcats men's basketball team =

American college basketball season

2018–19 Bethune–Cookman Wildcats men's basketball
- Conference: Mid-Eastern Athletic Conference
- Record: 14–17 (9–7 MEAC)
- Head coach: Ryan Ridder (2nd season)
- Assistant coaches: Dominique Taylor; Jeff Clapacs; Woody Taylor
- Home arena: Moore Gymnasium

2018–19 MEAC men's basketball standings
	Conf.				Overall
Team	W		L	PCT	W		L	PCT
Norfolk State	14	–	2	.875	22	–	14	.611
North Carolina A&T	13	–	3	.813	19	–	13	.594
North Carolina Central †	10	–	6	.625	18	–	16	.529
Howard	10	–	6	.625	17	–	17	.500
Bethune–Cookman	9	–	7	.563	14	–	17	.452
Florida A&M*	9	–	7	.563	12	–	19	.387
Savannah State	8	–	8	.500	11	–	20	.355
Coppin State	7	–	9	.438	8	–	25	.242
MD Eastern Shore	5	–	11	.313	7	–	25	.219
South Carolina State	5	–	11	.313	8	–	26	.235
Morgan State	4	–	12	.250	9	–	21	.300
Delaware State	2	–	14	.125	6	–	25	.194
† 2019 MEAC tournament winner *ineligible for postseason due to APR violations

The 2018–19 Bethune–Cookman Wildcats men's basketball team represented Bethune-Cookman University in the 2018–19 NCAA Division I men's basketball season. Led by second year head coach Ryan Ridder, they played their home games at Moore Gymnasium in Daytona Beach, Florida as members of the Mid-Eastern Athletic Conference. They finished the season 14–17 overall, 9–7 in MEAC play, finishing in a tie for fifth place. The team received a No. 5 seed in the MEAC tournament, where they were defeated 71–80 in the quarterfinals by No. 5 seed Howard.

== Previous season ==
The Wildcats finished the 2017–18 season 18–14, 12–4 in MEAC play, finishing in a three-way tie for first. Due to tie-breaking procedures, they received the No. 2 seed in the MEAC tournament, where they lost to Morgan State in the quarterfinals.

== Roster ==
2018–19 Bethune–Cookman Wildcats men's basketball team
Players
Coaches

Pos.	#	Name	Height	Weight	Year	Previous school	Hometown
G	1	Malik Maitland	5 ft 9 in (1.75 m)	171 lb (78 kg)	Jr	Morehead State	Daytona Beach, FL
G	2	Houston Smith	6 ft 4 in (1.93 m)	214 lb (97 kg)	Jr	Africentric	Columbus, OH
G/F	3	Wali Parks	6 ft 6 in (1.98 m)	218 lb (99 kg)	Jr	Des Moines Area CC	Iowa City, IA
G/F	4	Armani Collins	6 ft 6 in (1.98 m)	202 lb (92 kg)	Sr	City College of San Francisco	San Francisco, CA
G	5	Leon Redd	6 ft 0 in (1.83 m)	184 lb (83 kg)	Jr	Paris Junior College	Grand Rapids, MI
F	10	Cletrell Pope	6 ft 9 in (2.06 m)	203 lb (92 kg)	Jr	Southeastern Illinois College	Northport, AL
F	11	Soufiyane Diakite	6 ft 6 in (1.98 m)	195 lb (88 kg)	Sr	Morehead State	Bronx, NY
F	12	Shawntrez Davis	6 ft 9 in (2.06 m)	220 lb (100 kg)	Sr	South Plains College	Atlanta, GA
G	15	Mark Gordon	6 ft 5 in (1.96 m)	205 lb (93 kg)	Jr	Daytona State College	Eustis, FL
G	21	Dondre Duffus	6 ft 2 in (1.88 m)	184 lb (83 kg)	GS	Southeast Missouri State	Palm Beach, FL
G/F	22	Isaiah Bailey	6 ft 6 in (1.98 m)	192 lb (87 kg)	Sr	Angelina College	Compton, CA
F	23	David Francis	6 ft 6 in (1.98 m)	221 lb (100 kg)	Sr	College of Southern Maryland	Brooklyn, NY
F	32	Ulmer Manzie	6 ft 8 in (2.03 m)	238 lb (108 kg)	RS Jr	Africentric	Columbus, OH
G	33	Danny Harris, Jr.	6 ft 0 in (1.83 m)	187 lb (85 kg)	Jr	Boyd Anderson	Fort Lauderdale, FL
G	42	Jeremiah Gilyard	6 ft 2 in (1.88 m)	178 lb (81 kg)	Fr	DME Academy	Palatka, FL

Head coach

- Ryan Ridder (Embry–Riddle)

Assistant coach(es)

- Dominique Taylor (East Texas A&M)
- Jeff Clapacs (Wooster)
- Woody Taylor (Eckerd)

Legend

- (C) Team captain
- (S) Suspended
- (I) Ineligible
- (W) Walk-on
- Injured
- Current redshirt

Roster
Last update: December 31, 2018

== Schedule and results ==
Date time, TV	Rank^{#}	Opponent^{#}	Result	Record	Site (attendance) city, state
Non-conference regular season
November 7, 2018*; 7:30 pm, FS1		at DePaul	L 58–80	0–1	Wintrust Arena (3,710); Chicago, Illinois
November 10, 2018*; 4:00 pm, FS2		at Marquette	L 59–92	0–2	Fiserv Forum (14,409); Milwaukee, Wisconsin
November 13, 2018*; 7:00 pm		Trinity Baptist	W 104–44	1–2	Moore Gymnasium (741); Daytona Beach, Florida
November 15, 2018*; 7:00 pm		Johnson (FL)	W 97–47	2–2	Moore Gymnasium (657); Daytona Beach, Florida
November 17, 2018*; 2:00 pm		at Miami (FL)	L 70–78	2–3	Watsco Center (6,322); Coral Gables, Florida
November 20, 2018*; 7:00 pm		Omaha	L 56–76	2–4	Moore Gymnasium (781); Daytona Beach, Florida
November 26, 2018*; 7:00 pm		Stetson	W 84–74	3–4	Moore Gymnasium (751); Daytona Beach, Florida
December 1, 2018*; 4:00 pm		Florida Atlantic	W 72–70	4–4	Moore Gymnasium (891); Daytona Beach, Florida
December 4, 2018*; 10:00 pm		at Saint Mary's	L 61–93	4–5	McKeon Pavilion (2,307); Moraga, California
December 6, 2018*; 10:00 pm		at San Jose State	L 65–67	4–6	Event Center Arena (1,497); San Jose, California
December 8, 2018*; 10:00 pm		at Cal Poly	L 78–80 ^{OT}	4–7	Robert A. Mott Athletics Center (1,326); San Luis Obispo, California
December 15, 2018*; 6:00 pm		Jacksonville	L 71–79	4–8	Moore Gymnasium (617); Daytona Beach, Florida
December 19, 2019*; 7:00 pm		at Quinnipiac	L 63–87	4–9	People's United Center (548); Hamden, Connecticut
December 21, 2019*; 7:05 pm		at Boston University	W 74–66	5–9	Case Gym (363); Boston, Massachusetts
MEAC regular season
January 5, 2019; 4:00 pm		at North Carolina Central	L 59–68	5–10 (0–1)	McDougald–McLendon Gymnasium (1,057); Durham, North Carolina
January 12, 2019; 4:00 pm		at Howard	W 71–63	6–10 (1–1)	Burr Gymnasium (896); Washington, D.C.
January 14, 2019; 7:30 pm		at Norfolk State	L 68–75	6–11 (1–2)	Joseph G. Echols Memorial Hall (1,802); Norfolk, Virginia
January 19, 2019; 4:00 pm		Delaware State	W 69–49	7–11 (2–2)	Moore Gymnasium (801); Daytona Beach, Florida
January 21, 2019; 4:00 pm		Maryland Eastern Shore	W 89–68	8–11 (3–2)	Moore Gymnasium (614); Daytona Beach, Florida
January 26, 2019; 4:00 pm		at Morgan State	L 71–77	8–12 (3–3)	Talmadge L. Hill Field House (2,154); Baltimore, Maryland
January 28, 2019; 7:30 pm		at Coppin State	L 91–95	8–13 (3–4)	Physical Education Complex (413); Baltimore, Maryland
February 2, 2019; 4:00 pm		North Carolina Central	W 74–64	9–13 (4–4)	Moore Gymnasium (699); Daytona Beach, Florida
February 4, 2019; 4:00 pm		North Carolina A&T	W 69–53	10–13 (5–4)	Moore Gymnasium (781); Daytona Beach, Florida
February 9, 2019; 4:00 pm		Norfolk State	W 84–76	11–13 (6–4)	Moore Gymnasium (904); Daytona Beach, Florida
February 11, 2019; 7:30 pm		Howard	L 73–79	11–14 (6–5)	Moore Gymnasium (901); Daytona Beach, Florida
February 16, 2019; 4:00 pm		at South Carolina State	W 98–73	12–14 (7–5)	SHM Memorial Center; Orangeburg, South Carolina
February 18, 2019; 7:30 pm		at Savannah State	L 70–79	12–15 (7–6)	Tiger Arena (2,600); Savannah, Georgia
February 23, 2019; 4:00 pm		at Florida A&M	W 67–54	13–15 (8–6)	Teaching Gym (6,978); Tallahassee, Florida
March 2, 2019; 4:00 pm		South Carolina State	W 98–95 ^{OT}	14–15 (9–6)	Moore Gymnasium (671); Daytona Beach, Florida
March 7, 2019; 7:30 pm		Florida A&M	L 56–64	14–16 (9–7)	Moore Gymnasium (1,200); Daytona Beach, Florida
MEAC tournament
March 14, 2019; 8:00 pm	(5)	vs. (4) Howard; Quarterfinals	L 71–80	14–17	Norfolk Scope; Norfolk, Virginia
*Non-conference game. ^{#}Rankings from AP Poll. (#) Tournament seedings in parentheses. All times are in Eastern.
