= 2018–19 North Carolina A&T Aggies men's basketball team =

American college basketball season

2018–19 North Carolina A&T Aggies men's basketball
- Conference: Mid-Eastern Athletic Conference
- Record: 19–13 (13–3 MEAC)
- Head coach: Jay Joyner (3rd season)
- Assistant coaches: Willie Jones; Ahmad Dorsett; Andrew Brown
- Home arena: Corbett Sports Center

2018–19 MEAC men's basketball standings
	Conf.				Overall
Team	W		L	PCT	W		L	PCT
Norfolk State	14	–	2	.875	22	–	14	.611
North Carolina A&T	13	–	3	.813	19	–	13	.594
North Carolina Central †	10	–	6	.625	18	–	16	.529
Howard	10	–	6	.625	17	–	17	.500
Bethune–Cookman	9	–	7	.563	14	–	17	.452
Florida A&M*	9	–	7	.563	12	–	19	.387
Savannah State	8	–	8	.500	11	–	20	.355
Coppin State	7	–	9	.438	8	–	25	.242
MD Eastern Shore	5	–	11	.313	7	–	25	.219
South Carolina State	5	–	11	.313	8	–	26	.235
Morgan State	4	–	12	.250	9	–	21	.300
Delaware State	2	–	14	.125	6	–	25	.194
† 2019 MEAC tournament winner *ineligible for postseason due to APR violations

The 2018–19 North Carolina A&T Aggies men's basketball team represented North Carolina Agricultural and Technical State University during the 2018–19 NCAA Division I men's basketball season. The Aggies, led by third-year head coach Jay Joyner, played their home games at the Corbett Sports Center in Greensboro, North Carolina as members of the Mid-Eastern Athletic Conference.

== Previous season ==
The Aggies finished the 2017–18 season 20–15, 11–5 in MEAC play to finish in a tie for fourth place. They defeated Delaware State and Norfolk State to advance to the semifinals of the MEAC tournament where they lost to Hampton. They were invited to the CollegeInsider.com Tournament where they lost in the first round to Liberty.

== Roster ==
2018–19 North Carolina A&T Aggies men's basketball team
Players
Coaches

Pos.	#	Name	Height	Weight	Year	Previous school	Hometown
G	0	Andre Jackson	6 ft 4 in (1.93 m)	175 lb (79 kg)	Jr	Independence	Charlotte, North Carolina
G	1	Aaren Edmead	5 ft 10 in (1.78 m)	165 lb (75 kg)	Sr	Deer Park	Deer Park, New York
G	3	Quavius Copeland	6 ft 1 in (1.85 m)	178 lb (81 kg)	RS Jr	Middle Tennessee	Greenville, South Carolina
G/F	4	Terry Harris	6 ft 6 in (1.98 m)	215 lb (98 kg)	RS Sr	Eastern Michigan	Dix Hills, New York
G/F	5	Ed Ferguson	6 ft 5 in (1.96 m)	190 lb (86 kg)	Fr	St. Frances (MD)	Baltimore, Maryland
C	10	Ibrahim Sylla	6 ft 8 in (2.03 m)	200 lb (91 kg)	GS	Northern Colorado	Harlem, New York
C	11	D'Andre Johnson	6 ft 10 in (2.08 m)	225 lb (102 kg)	So	Gould Academy	Washington, D.C.
G	13	Kameron Langley	6 ft 2 in (1.88 m)	205 lb (93 kg)	So	Southwest Guilford	Greensboro, North Carolina
G/F	14	Travon Mayo	6 ft 5 in (1.96 m)	190 lb (86 kg)	Fr	Piedmont Classical	Greensboro, North Carolina
G	15	Amari Hamilton	6 ft 1 in (1.85 m)	165 lb (75 kg)	RS Sr	Southern Durham	Durham, North Carolina
F	21	Ron Jackson Jr.	6 ft 8 in (2.03 m)	205 lb (93 kg)	RS Jr	Hillsborough CC	Clay County, Florida
G	22	Milik Gantz	6 ft 3 in (1.91 m)	180 lb (82 kg)	Sr	Harcum College	Harrisburg, Pennsylvania
G	24	Elijah Joyner	6 ft 5 in (1.96 m)	175 lb (79 kg)	Fr	Piedmont Classical	Greensboro, North Carolina
F	25	Webster Filmore	6 ft 6 in (1.98 m)	200 lb (91 kg)	Fr	Phillip O. Berry	Charlotte, North Carolina
C	33	Nelson Nweke	6 ft 9 in (2.06 m)	235 lb (107 kg)	GS	Arkansas State	Grandview, Missouri
G	35	Tyrone Lyons	6 ft 6 in (1.98 m)	180 lb (82 kg)	Fr	St. Anthony's (NY)	Amityville, New York

Head coach

- Jay Joyner (South Carolina State)

Assistant coach(es)

- Willie Jones (South Carolina State)
- Ahmad Dorsett (George Mason)
- Andrew Brown (Mercer)

Legend

- (C) Team captain
- (S) Suspended
- (I) Ineligible
- (W) Walk-on
- Injured
- Current redshirt

Roster
Last update: November 28, 2018

== Schedule and results ==
Date time, TV	Rank^{#}	Opponent^{#}	Result	Record	Site (attendance) city, state
Non-conference regular season
Nov 6, 2018*; 7:30 pm		UNC Greensboro; Battle of Market Street	L 66–74	0–1	Corbett Sports Center (5,006); Greensboro, NC
Nov 10, 2018*; 2:00 pm, ACCN Extra		at Wake Forest	L 78–90	0–2	LJVM Coliseum (5,572); Winston-Salem, NC
Nov 12, 2018*; 7:00 pm, ESPNU		at Maryland	L 59–82	0–3	Xfinity Center (10,958); College Park, MD
November 14, 2018*; 7:00 pm		at Hofstra	L 72–92	0–4	Mack Sports Complex (1,209); Hempstead, NY
Nov 19, 2018*; 7:00 pm, ESPN+		at Marshall	L 71–95	0–5	Cam Henderson Center (6,050); Huntington, WV
Nov 21, 2018*; 5:00 pm		at Mount St. Mary's	W 74–60	1–5	Knott Arena (1,295); Emmitsburg, MD
Nov 29, 2018*; 7:30 pm		Central Connecticut	W 72–60	2–5	Corbett Sports Center (1,909); Greensboro, NC
Dec 1, 2018*; 4:00 pm		Presbyterian	L 70–75	2–6	Corbett Sports Center (954); Greensboro, NC
Dec 8, 2018*; 4:00 pm		Greensboro	W 92–67	3–6	Corbett Sports Center (604); Greensboro, NC
Dec 15, 2018*; 5:00 pm, ESPN+		at Tennessee State	W 78–76	4–6	Gentry Complex (303); Nashville, TN
Dec 19, 2018*; 7:00 pm, ACCN Extra		at No. 13 Virginia Tech	L 60–82	4–7	Cassell Coliseum (6,681); Blacksburg, VA
Dec 21, 2018*; 8:00 pm, BTN+		at Minnesota	L 67–86	4–8	Williams Arena (10,144); Minneapolis, MN
Dec 28, 2018*; 7:00 pm, ESPN3		at East Carolina	L 57–77	4–9	Williams Arena (4,761); Greenville, NC
MEAC regular season
Jan 5, 2019; 4:00 pm		at South Carolina State	W 80–77 ^{OT}	5–9 (1–0)	SHM Memorial Center (356); Orangeburg, SC
Jan 8, 2019*; 7:30 pm		Mid-Atlantic Christian	W 104–56	6–9	Corbett Sports Center (702); Greensboro, NC
Jan 12, 2019; 4:00 pm		at Delaware State	W 93–70	7–9 (2–0)	Memorial Hall (560); Dover, DE
Jan 14, 2019; 7:30 pm		at Maryland-Eastern Shore	W 67–58	8–9 (3–0)	Hytche Athletic Center (842); Princess Anne, MD
Jan 19, 2019; 4:30 pm		Morgan State	W 57–53	9–9 (4–0)	Corbett Sports Center (2,242); Greensboro, NC
Jan 21, 2019; 7:40 pm		Coppin State	W 80–71	10–9 (5–0)	Corbett Sports Center (2,399); Greensboro, NC
Jan 26, 2019; 4:00 pm		at North Carolina Central	W 51–48	11–9 (6–0)	McDougald-McLendon Gymnasium (3,043); Durham, NC
Feb 2, 2019; 4:00 pm		at Florida A&M	L 39–63	11–10 (6–1)	Teaching Gym (1,845); Tallahassee, FL
Feb 4, 2019; 7:50 pm		at Bethune-Cookman	L 53–69	11–11 (6–2)	Moore Gymnasium (781); Daytona Beach, FL
Feb 9, 2019; 4:15 pm		Delaware State	W 82–52	12–11 (7–2)	Corbett Sports Center (1,904); Greensboro, NC
Feb 11, 2019; 7:45 pm		Maryland-Eastern Shore	W 68–61	13–11 (8–2)	Corbett Sports Center (1,944); Greensboro, NC
Feb 16, 2019; 4:00 pm		at Howard	W 85–81	14–11 (9–2)	Burr Gymnasium; Washington, D.C.
Feb 18, 2019; 8:00 pm		at Norfolk State	L 58–76	14–12 (9–3)	Echols Hall (3,913); Norfolk, VA
Feb 23, 2019; 4:30 pm		South Carolina State	W 63–62	15–12 (10–3)	Corbett Sports Center (3,698); Greensboro, NC
Feb 25, 2019; 7:30 pm		Savannah State	W 63–58	16–12 (11–3)	Corbett Sports Center (1,904); Greensboro, NC
Mar 2, 2019; 4:00 pm		Florida A&M	W 63–42	17–12 (12–3)	Corbett Sports Center (908); Greensboro, NC
Mar 7, 2019; 7:30 pm		North Carolina Central	W 74–52	18–12 (13–3)	Corbett Sports Center (3,235); Greensboro, NC
MEAC tournament
Mar 13, 2019; 8:00 pm, ESPN3	(2)	vs. (7) Coppin State; Quarterfinals	W 82–79 ^{OT}	19–12	Norfolk Scope; Norfolk, VA
Mar 15, 2019; 8:00 pm, ESPN3	(2)	vs. (3) North Carolina Central; Semifinals	L 63–65	19–13	Norfolk Scope; Norfolk, VA
*Non-conference game. ^{#}Rankings from AP Poll. (#) Tournament seedings in parentheses. All times are in Eastern Time.
