= LeVelle Moton =

American basketball player & coach (born 1974)

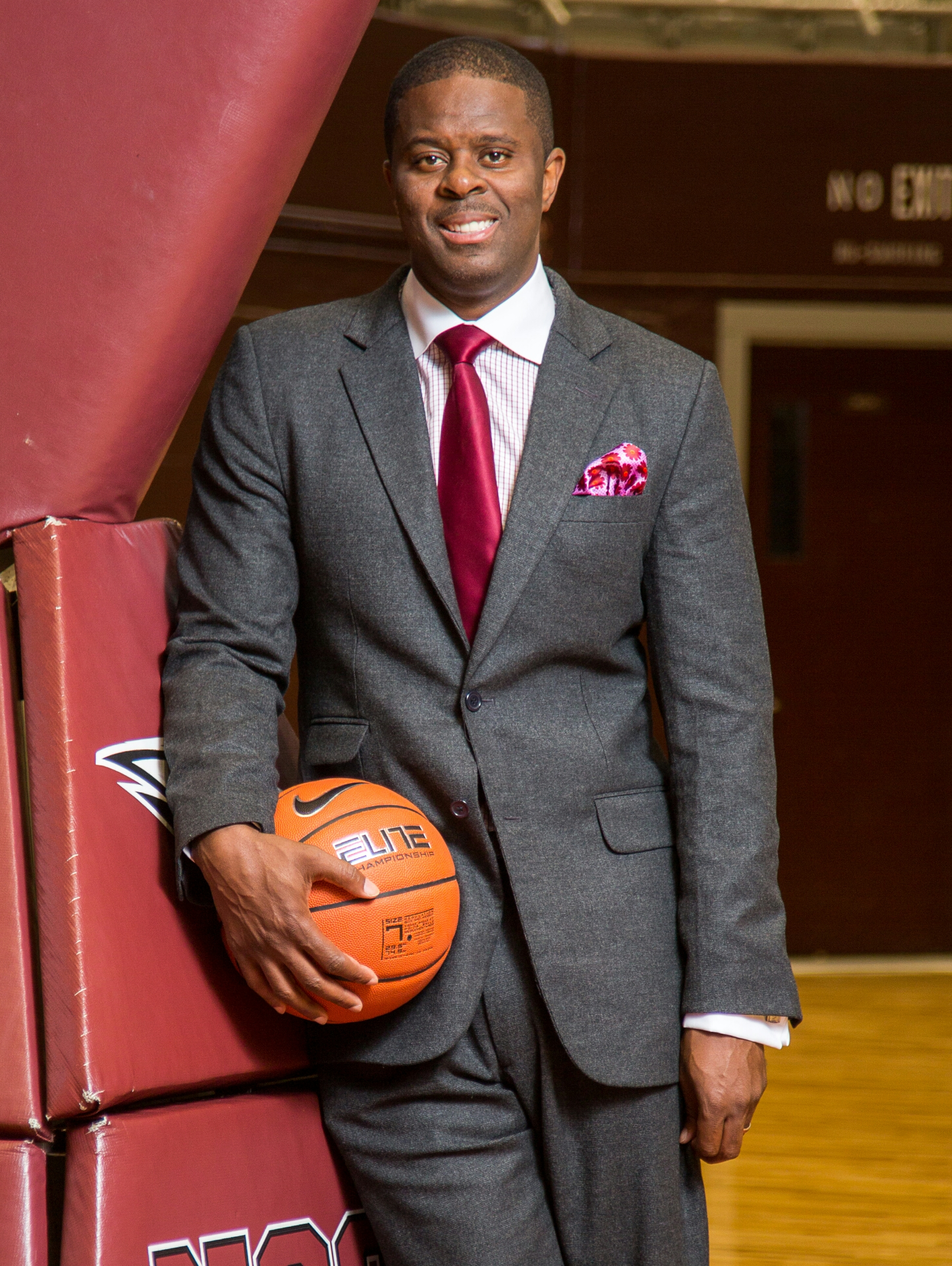

Current position
- Title: Head coach
- Team: North Carolina Central
- Conference: MEAC
- Record: 301–251 (.545)

Biographical details
- Born: June 16, 1974 (age 52); Boston, Massachusetts, U.S.

Playing career
- 1992–1996: North Carolina Central
- Position: Shooting guard

Coaching career (HC unless noted)
- 2004–2007: Sanderson HS
- 2007–2009: North Carolina Central (asst.)
- 2009–present: North Carolina Central

Head coaching record
- Overall: 301–251 (.545) (college); 59–25 (.702) (high school)
- Tournaments: 0–4 (NCAA Division I); 0–1 (NIT)

Accomplishments and honors

Championships
- 4 MEAC regular season (2014, 2015, 2017, 2020); 4 MEAC tournament (2014, 2017–2019)

Awards
- 2x MEAC Coach of the Year (2014, 2017)

LeVelle DeShea Moton (born June 16, 1974) is an American college basketball coach and the current head coach of the men's basketball team at North Carolina Central University. He was a former player at North Carolina Central, having graduated in 1996.

== Early life ==
Moton was born in Boston, Massachusetts on June 16, 1974. He and his older brother Earl were raised in the Orchard Park housing projects, the same projects as R&B group New Edition. His mother and grandmother raised LeVelle and his brother in the rough era of the crack epidemic. One time, as a youth, Moton attempted to sell drugs to provide for his family, a local druglord told other dealers he would punish them if they hired Moton. Hattie, his mother, decided to move her sons out of Boston to try and give them a better life and moved to Raleigh, North Carolina. Moton attended Daniels Middle School, where his jersey is retired, and went on to play at Enloe High School. He and his family lived in Lane Street projects which was right down the street from the Boys Club of Raleigh. Moton started attending the Boys Club and credits it with being one of the things that saved his life and kept him off the streets. There, he encountered Ron Williams, who became a father figure to him. For over 30 years Coach Williams has been an intimate part of Moton's life. Serving as a mentor, advisor and friend, Coach Williams and the Boys Club were a refuge for Moton and many other youth in the neighborhood, including future NBA star PJ Tucker.

== High school ==
He was a three-year letter-winner (1989–92) under head coach Frank Williams. Named All-Conference ('90-'92), All-State ('92), Cap5 Player of the Year ('92), Triangle Player for the Year ('92), and McDonalds's All-American Honorable Mention ('92). Two-time Conference Champions. (89–90) As a sophomore, averaged 11.2 points and 5.0 rebounds per game. Tallied game high 23 points versus Apex High. (90–91) As a junior, averaged 23.1 points and 6.0 rebounds per contest. Scored game-high 38 points against Millbrook. (91–92)As a senior, averaged 29.4 points and 7.0 rebounds per game. Racked-up game high 51 points versus Cary High School.

== College ==
From 1992–1996 Moton was a standout player at North Carolina Central University in Durham, North Carolina. In 1996, he graduated from NCCU with a bachelor's degree in recreation administration. Moton became the school's third all-time leading scorer with 1,714 points during his historic hardwood career as an Eagle from 1992–96, earning the nickname "Poetry 'n Moton."

During his junior and senior seasons, Moton was voted All-CIAA First Team, NCAA Division II South Atlantic All-Region First Team and NCAA Division II All-America Honorable Mention. He was named the 1996 CIAA (Central Intercollegiate Athletic Association) Men's Basketball Player of the Year and was inducted into the NCCU Athletics Hall of Fame in 2004.

Among NCCU's all-time career leaders, Moton ranks first in 3-point field goals made (213 of 529), third in scoring (1,714 points), fourth in free throws made (363 of 467), fifth in assists (278), eighth in field goals made (569 of 1,159), 10th in scoring average (16.6 points per game), and 11th in steals (110).

As a junior (1994–95), he topped the CIAA and was No. 16 in NCAA Division II in scoring with an average of 23.5 points per game. His 87 made three-point field goals that year broke the school's single-season record. As a senior (1995–96), he placed second in the CIAA with 21.3 points per game and ranked among the conference's top 10 statistical leaders in assists, free throw percentage and 3-point field goal percentage.

Moton played on three CIAA Southern Division Championship teams and made two trips to the NCAA playoffs, including an NCAA Division II South Atlantic Regional Championship title in 1993. During his NCCU playing career, his teams racked up an 80-28 record, which included three 20-win seasons.

== Professional career ==
After NCCU, Moton played four years of professional basketball in Indonesia (1996–97) and Israel (1998–99). Throughout his professional playing career, Moton averaged 25.0 points per contest, and dished out a little more than five assists per game as a pro.

== Coaching career ==
On March 25, 2009, arguably one of the greatest players in school history was elevated from assistant coach to the position of head coach, becoming the 17th to be named in that spot in the program's history.

During the 2016–17 season Moton led the Eagles to a 25–9 overall record and a 13-3 MEAC mark, and he joined rare company with John B. McLendon as the only coaches with four 20-win seasons at NCCU. NCCU captured its third MEAC regular-season championship and second MEAC Tournament championship within a four-year span to make its second Division-I NCAA Tournament appearance. The Eagles also made history with their first win over an SEC opponent with a wire-to-wire 62–52 win at Missouri. NCCU went on a 13-game win streak during conference play, the second-longest win streak in the Division-I era. The Eagles continued to pride itself on defense by being second in the nation in three-point defense, allowing just 29.0 percent made attempts. NCCU was also top-10 in field goal percentage defense (39.1), top-25 in scoring defense (63.4 points per game) and top-15 in scoring margin (11.7 points per game).

Close to 25 years after the magical run of the 1989 NCAA Division II National Championship team, and just 10 days shy of the fifth anniversary of the day of his official hiring, NCCU soared to its first MEAC tournament championship on March 15, 2014 following its 71–62 victory over Morgan State in front of a near-capacity crowd inside the Norfolk Scope Arena. The 2013–14 Eagles tied a school record in wins (28), won the most games in a season for any squad in MEAC history, and was the lowest seed for any league champion in the NCAA Tournament as the maroon and gray earned a 14-seed in the East Region. Moton's squad finished 15–1 in conference play earning the school's first Division I regular season title and won 20 straight contests, which set a new NCAA Division I level record for the program.

With the rings of a champion came the accolades as Moton earned MEAC Coach of the Year honors, MEAC Tournament's Most Outstanding Coach award, and was named the BoxtoRow.com HBCU National Coach of the Year, while earning finalist spots in the Hugh Durham National Coach of the Year Award (Top-Mid-Major Coach), and the Top Minority Coach honor, the Ben Jobe National Coach of the Year Award.

The following year, his sixth season as head coach at NCCU, Moton guided the 2014–15 Eagles to a 25–8 overall record, including a 19–3 mark during the final three-and-a-half months, as well as the school's first appearance in the National Invitation Tournament. The 2014–15 squad made history by becoming the first men's basketball team in school history to post an unbeaten regular-season conference record at 16–0 to repeat as MEAC regular-season champions. The Eagles were among the top five defenses in Division I, ranking second in field goal percentage defense (behind Kentucky), fourth in three-point field goal percentage defense and fifth in scoring defense. NCCU completed the campaign by extending the second-longest home win streak in Division I at 35 victories in-a-row (behind Arizona). Moton joined hall of fame coach John McLendon and national championship coach Michael Bernard as the only coaches in NCCU men's basketball history to lead the Eagles to three straight 20-win seasons. As a credit to the program's recent success, NCCU boasts the best regular-season conference record during the last three seasons at 46–2, a winning percentage of .958.

The maroon and gray's second season in the MEAC, Moton's fourth, was the coming out party for the program. For the first time at the NCAA Division I level, the Eagles won 20 games finishing the year 22-9, and went 15–1 in conference play to earn the No. 2 seed in the conference tournament. In fact, the program experienced only two losses in the calendar year of 2013. The 22 victories were the most since his freshman year of 1992–93 when NCCU finished 26–4. The 11-game winning streak was the longest since the 1995–96 campaign when NCCU won 16-in-a-row. Moton earned national praise by being named a finalist for the Ben Jobe National Coach of the Year Award, and the Hugh Durham National Coach of the Year of Award, along with Co-Coach of the Year in the MEAC by CollegeInsider.com.

In his third season in charge of the North Carolina Central University basketball program, Moton took his team to a place not since seen since the 2004-05 season when the Eagles finished with a winning record (17–15) and were seeded fifth in their first MEAC Tournament at the Division I level. Of the 215 schools that have reclassified to the NCAA Division I level, NCCU was one of 38 schools across the nation who finished their first official season with 17 wins or more. That puts the Eagles in the same company as (Air Force–1958, VCU–1974, Weber State–1964, George Mason–1979, UNLV–1970, James Madison–1977, and Northwestern State (La.)–1997) who also recorded 17 wins in its inaugural campaign.

His second year at the helm his squad showed the Eagle Nation how bright the future was as his squad racked up 15 wins and recorded the first non-losing season in nearly six years. His record against MEAC opponents during the regular season was 10–5 which would have placed the maroon and gray as the number two seed in the league tournament. He earned NCAA Division I Independent Coach of the Year honors.

Year No. 1 was certainly a challenging one for Moton, but the program took numerous steps in the right direction. During the 2009-10 campaign, Moton led NCCU to its first winning record at home (7–4), its first Division I winning streak (three games), and gave numerous big-time opponents trouble throughout the season, but the second year head coach is nowhere near satisfied.

The Eagles finished 7–22, which included wins against soon-to-be conference foes Maryland Eastern Shore and Savannah State. The seven victories represented the most since making the move to Division I.

He initially returned to his alma mater as assistant men's basketball coach in July 2007.

The NCCU Athletics Hall-of-Famer joined the NCCU staff after serving as head boys basketball coach at Sanderson High School in his hometown of Raleigh, N.C. During his three-year tenure (2004–07) at Sanderson, Moton led the Spartans to an overall record of 59-25, while winning back-to-back Cap-7 tournament championships in 2006 and 2007.

== Head coaching record ==
Record table
Season	Team	Overall	Conference	Standing	Postseason
North Carolina Central Eagles (NCAA Division I independent) (2009–2011)
2009–10	North Carolina Central	7–22			
2010–11	North Carolina Central	15–15			
North Carolina Central Eagles (Mid-Eastern Athletic Conference) (2011–present)
2011–12	North Carolina Central	17–15	10–6	5th	
2012–13	North Carolina Central	22–9	15–1	2nd	
2013–14	North Carolina Central	28–6	15–1	1st	NCAA Division I Round of 64
2014–15	North Carolina Central	25–8	16–0	1st	NIT First Round
2015–16	North Carolina Central	13–19	7–9	T–6th	
2016–17	North Carolina Central	25–9	13–3	1st	NCAA Division I First Four
2017–18	North Carolina Central	19–16	9–7	6th	NCAA Division I First Four
2018–19	North Carolina Central	18–16	10–6	T–3rd	NCAA Division I First Four
2019–20	North Carolina Central	18–13	13–3	1st	No postseason held
2020–21	North Carolina Central	5–9	3–5	3rd (Southern)	
2021–22	North Carolina Central	16–15	8–5	3rd	
2022–23	North Carolina Central	18–12	10–4	2nd	
2023–24	North Carolina Central	18–13	9–5	T–2nd	
2024–25	North Carolina Central	14–19	6–8	6th	
2025–26	North Carolina Central	14–18	8–6	T–3rd	
2026–27	North Carolina Central	1–5	0–0		
North Carolina Central:		301–251 (.545)	156–70 (.690)		
Total:		301–251 (.545)			
National champion Postseason invitational champion Conference regular season champion Conference regular season and conference tournament champion Division regular season champion Division regular season and conference tournament champion Conference tournament champion

== Personal ==
Moton and his wife, Bridget, married on June 28, 2008. They have two children Brooke and LeVelle Jr.

== Philanthropy ==
Single Mother's Salute

The VelleCares Foundation hosts an annual event titled “Single Mother Salute.” The program recognizes more than 100 single mothers each year from the Triangle region. The event was established to acknowledge the challenges associated with single parenthood. LeVelle Moton, who was raised by a single mother, presents awards for courage, strength, and perseverance, as well as a “Single Mother of the Year” award named in honor of his mother, Hattie McDougald.

LeVelle Moton Back To School Community Day

Each year, LeVelle Moton hosts a “Back to School Community Day” at the Raleigh Boys & Girls Club, in collaboration with NBA player P. J. Tucker. The event serves more than 700 children and families annually by distributing backpacks, school supplies, and other materials, and by offering activities for attendees. Local families and community representatives participate in the event. Moton, a former participant in the Boys & Girls Club, has contributed his time to support the program.

== Coaching Awards ==
- 2016-17: NABC District 15 Coach of the Year
- 2016-17: BoxToRow.com HBCU National Co-Coach of the Year
- 2016-17: MEAC Coach of the Year
- 2016-17: Finalist Hugh Durham National Coach of the Year Award (Top Mid-Major Coach)
- 2016-17: Finalist Ben Jobe National Coach of the Year Award (Top Minority Coach)
- 2016-17: MEAC tournament champions
- 2016-17: MEAC Tournament (Most Outstanding Coach)
- 2016-17: MEAC Regular Season Champions (13-3)
- 2016-17: Two All-MEAC Selections (Player of the Year)
- 2015-16: One All-MEAC Selection
- 2014-15: NABC District 15 Coach of the Year
- 2014-15: Finalist Hugh Durham National Coach of the Year Award (Top Mid-Major Coach)
- 2014-15: Finalist Ben Jobe National Coach of the Year Award (Top Minority Coach)
- 2014-15: MEAC Regular Season Champions (16-0)
- 2014-15: Five All-MEAC Selections
- 2014-15: Third consecutive 20-win season (25-8)
- 2013-14: Tied School record for single-season wins (28)
- 2013-14: Set MEAC Record for wins in a season (28)
- 2013-14: Finalist Hugh Durham National Coach of the Year Award (Top Mid-Major Coach)
- 2013-14: Finalist Ben Jobe National Coach of the Year Award (Top Minority Coach)
- 2013-14: BoxToRow.com HBCU National Coach of the Year
- 2013-14: CollegeInsider.com (MEAC Coach of the Year)
- 2013-14: MEAC Tournament (Most Outstanding Coach)
- 2013-14: MEAC Coach of the Year
- 2013-14: MEAC Regular Season Champions (15-1)
- 2013-14: Two All-MEAC Selections (Player of the Year)
- 2013-14: Back-to-Back 20-win seasons (25-5)
- 2012-13: First 20-win season since 1996-97 (22-9)
- 2012-13: Three All-MEAC Selections
- 2012-13: CollegeInsider.com MEAC Co-Coach of the Year
- 2012-13: Finalist Ben Jobe National Coach of the Year Award (Top Minority Coach)
- 2012-13: Finalist Hugh Durham National Coach of the Year Award (Top Mid-Major Coach)
- 2011-12: First winning season since 2004-05 (17-15)
- 2011-12: Two All-MEAC Selections
- 2010-11: NCAA Division I Independent Coach of the Year
