= 2018–19 Morgan State Bears basketball team =

American college basketball season

2018–19 Morgan State Bears men's basketball
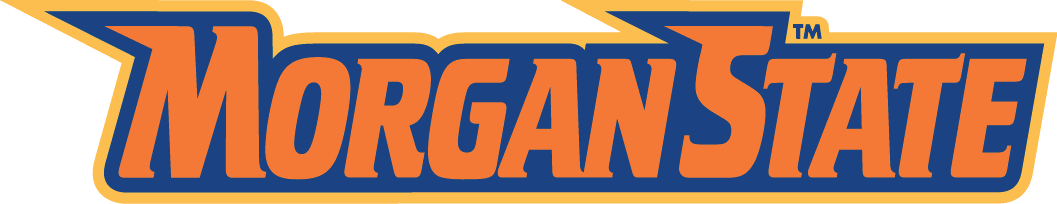
- Conference: Mid-Eastern Athletic Conference
- Record: 9–21 (4–12 MEAC)
- Head coach: Todd Bozeman (13th season)
- Assistant coaches: Brian Ellerbe; Larry Stewart; Hans Desir
- Home arena: Talmadge L. Hill Field House

2018–19 MEAC men's basketball standings
	Conf.				Overall
Team	W		L	PCT	W		L	PCT
Norfolk State	14	–	2	.875	22	–	14	.611
North Carolina A&T	13	–	3	.813	19	–	13	.594
North Carolina Central †	10	–	6	.625	18	–	16	.529
Howard	10	–	6	.625	17	–	17	.500
Bethune–Cookman	9	–	7	.563	14	–	17	.452
Florida A&M*	9	–	7	.563	12	–	19	.387
Savannah State	8	–	8	.500	11	–	20	.355
Coppin State	7	–	9	.438	8	–	25	.242
MD Eastern Shore	5	–	11	.313	7	–	25	.219
South Carolina State	5	–	11	.313	8	–	26	.235
Morgan State	4	–	12	.250	9	–	21	.300
Delaware State	2	–	14	.125	6	–	25	.194
† 2019 MEAC tournament winner *ineligible for postseason due to APR violations

The 2018–19 Morgan State Bears men's basketball team represented Morgan State University in the 2018–19 NCAA Division I men's basketball season. They played their home games at Talmadge L. Hill Field House in Baltimore, Maryland, and were led by 13th-year head coach Todd Bozeman. The Bears finished the season 9–21, 4–12 in MEAC play to finish in tenth place. As the No. 10 seed in the MEAC tournament, they lost in the first round to Coppin State.

== Previous season ==
The Bears finished the 2017–18 season 13–19, 7–9 in MEAC play to finish in a three-way tie for seventh place. As the No. 7 seed in the MEAC tournament, they defeated South Carolina State and Bethune–Cookman, before losing to North Carolina Central in the semifinals.

== Roster ==
2018–19 Morgan State Bears men's basketball team
Players
Coaches

Pos.	#	Name	Height	Weight	Year	Previous school	Hometown
G	0	Stanley Davis	6 ft 5 in (1.96 m)	198 lb (90 kg)	Jr	STEM Academy	Chester, PA
G	1	LaPri McCray-Pace	6 ft 4 in (1.93 m)	210 lb (95 kg)	So	Conwell–Egan Catholic	Philadelphia, PA
G	2	Martez Cameron	5 ft 11 in (1.8 m)	185 lb (84 kg)	Sr	Montverde Academy	Chicago, IL
F	3	Victor Curry	6 ft 8 in (2.03 m)	215 lb (98 kg)	Jr	Cleveland State CC	Chicago, IL
G	4	Kyson Rawls	6 ft 1 in (1.85 m)	190 lb (86 kg)	So	St. Georges Tech HS	New Castle, DE
G	5	Sherwyn Devonish-Prince Jr.	6 ft 1 in (1.85 m)	160 lb (73 kg)	Fr	Wise	Bladensburg, MD
G	10	Antonio Gillespie	6 ft 0 in (1.83 m)	170 lb (77 kg)	Sr	Central	Memphis, TN
G	11	Malik Miller	6 ft 4 in (1.93 m)	185 lb (84 kg)	Fr	Friendship Tech Prep	Washington, D.C.
G	12	Ranell Bell	6 ft 3 in (1.91 m)	205 lb (93 kg)	Jr	County College of Morris	Morristown, NJ
G	13	Tyler Streeter	6 ft 4 in (1.93 m)	190 lb (86 kg)	Sr	St. Francis de Sales	Chicago, IL
G	15	Isaiah Burke	6 ft 1 in (1.85 m)	175 lb (79 kg)	Fr	Bowie	Annapolis, MD
F	23	Jordan Little	6 ft 8 in (2.03 m)	240 lb (109 kg)	RS Jr	Brookdale CC	Jersey City, NJ
F	24	Taron Oliver Jr.	6 ft 9 in (2.06 m)	250 lb (113 kg)	Jr	Salt Lake CC	District Heights, MD
F	32	David Syfax	6 ft 7 in (2.01 m)	205 lb (93 kg)	Jr	Pershing	Detroit, MI

Head coach

- Todd Bozeman (Rhode Island)

Assistant coach(es)

- Brian Ellerbe (Rutgers)
- Larry Stewart (Coppin State)
- Hans Desir (St. Catharine)

Legend

- (C) Team captain
- (S) Suspended
- (I) Ineligible
- (W) Walk-on
- Injured
- Current redshirt

Roster
Last update: December 30, 2018

== Schedule and results ==
Date time, TV	Rank^{#}	Opponent^{#}	Result	Record	Site (attendance) city, state
Non-conference regular season
November 6, 2018*; 7:00 pm, FS1		at No. 9 Villanova	L 77–100	0–1	Finneran Pavilion (6,501); Villanova, Pennsylvania
November 9, 2018*; 7:00 pm		at Saint Francis	L 62–80	0–2	DeGol Arena (1,172); Loretto, Pennsylvania
November 12, 2018*; 8:30 pm, FS1		at DePaul	L 63–91	0–3	Wintrust Arena (3,664); Chicago, Illinois
November 20, 2018*; 7:00 pm		Navy	W 75–51	1–3	Talmadge L. Hill Field House (2,034); Baltimore, Maryland
November 25, 2018*; 1:00 pm		Mount St. Mary's	W 78–68	2–3	Talmadge L. Hill Field House (372); Baltimore, Maryland
November 28, 2018*; 7:00 pm, ESPN+		at George Mason	L 75–82	2–4	EagleBank Arena (2,591); Fairfax, Virginia
December 3, 2018*; 7:00 pm, ACCN Extra/WatchESPN		at No. 4 Virginia	L 45–83	2–5	John Paul Jones Arena (13,397); Charlottesville, Virginia
December 5, 2018*; 7:00 pm		Binghamton	W 74–68	3–5	Talmadge L. Hill Field House (1,008); Baltimore, Maryland
December 8, 2018*; 1:00 pm		vs. Towson; Charm City Classic	W 74–69	4–5	Royal Farms Arena (2,717); Baltimore, Maryland
December 17, 2018*; 7:00 pm		Wilmington	W 85–78	5–5	Talmadge L. Hill Field House (276); Baltimore, Maryland
December 22, 2018*; 2:00 pm, C-USA TV		at Old Dominion	L 53–76	5–6	Ted Constant Convocation Center (5,719); Norfolk, Virginia
December 29, 2018*; 10:00 pm, CSUN Sports Network		at Cal State Northridge	L 86–94	5–7	Matadome (619); Northridge, California
January 3, 2019*; 3:00 pm		Lincoln (PA)	L 75–77	5–8	Talmadge L. Hill Field House (78); Baltimore, Maryland
MEAC regular season
January 5, 2019; 4:00 pm		Maryland Eastern Shore	W 66–53	6–8 (1–0)	Talmadge L. Hill Field House (489); Baltimore, Maryland
January 7, 2019; 7:30 pm		Savannah State	L 87–88	6–9 (1–1)	Talmadge L. Hill Field House (788); Baltimore, Maryland
January 12, 2019; 4:00 pm		South Carolina State	L 68–72	6–10 (1–2)	Talmadge L. Hill Field House (690); Baltimore, Maryland
January 14, 2019; 7:30 pm		at Howard	W 89–86 ^{OT}	7–10 (2–2)	Burr Gymnasium (2,153); Washington, D.C.
January 19, 2019; 4:00 pm		at North Carolina A&T	L 53–57	7–11 (2–3)	Corbett Sports Center (2,242); Greensboro, North Carolina
January 21, 2019; 4:00 pm		at North Carolina Central	L 64–92	7–12 (2–4)	McDougald–McLendon Gymnasium (1,171); Durham, North Carolina
January 26, 2019; 4:00 pm		Bethune–Cookman	W 77–71	8–12 (3–4)	Talmadge L. Hill Field House (2,154); Baltimore, Maryland
January 28, 2019; 7:30 pm		Florida A&M	L 66–72	8–13 (3–5)	Talmadge L. Hill Field House (2,706); Baltimore, Maryland
February 2, 2019; 4:00 pm		at Coppin State	L 71–73	8–14 (3–6)	Physical Education Complex (1,523); Baltimore, Maryland
February 9, 2019; 4:00 pm		at South Carolina State	L 81–85	8–15 (3–7)	SHM Memorial Center (690); Orangeburg, South Carolina
February 11, 2019; 7:30 pm, ESPNU		at Savannah State	L 85–88	8–16 (3–8)	Tiger Arena (1,845); Savannah, Georgia
February 23, 2019; 4:00 pm		Norfolk State	L 74–75	8–17 (3–9)	Talmadge L. Hill Field House (1,789); Baltimore, Maryland
February 25, 2019; 7:30 pm		Howard	L 69–75	8–18 (3–10)	Talmadge L. Hill Field House (3,510); Baltimore, Maryland
March 2, 2019; 4:00 pm		at Delaware State	W 76–58	9–18 (4–10)	Memorial Hall (819); Dover, Delaware
March 4, 2019; 7:30 pm		at Maryland Eastern Shore	L 73–78	9–19 (4–11)	Hytche Athletic Center (2,379); Princess Anne, Maryland
March 7, 2019; 7:30 pm		Coppin State	L 69–83	9–20 (4–12)	Talmadge L. Hill Field House (4,213); Baltimore, Maryland
MEAC tournament
March 12, 2019; 8:30 p.m.	(10)	vs. (7) Coppin State; First round	L 71–81	9–21	Norfolk Scope; Norfolk, Virginia
*Non-conference game. ^{#}Rankings from AP Poll. (#) Tournament seedings in parentheses. All times are in Eastern.
