= Eric Skeeters =

American college basketball coach

Biographical details
- Born: Baltimore, Maryland, U.S.
- Education: Coppin State '97

Playing career
- 1990–1991: Catonsville CC

Coaching career (HC unless noted)
- 1992–1996: St. Frances Acad. (asst.)
- 1996–1999: Coppin State (asst.)
- 1999–2003: Youngstown State (asst.)
- 2003–2004: Virginia Tech (asst.)
- 2004–2009: Towson (asst.)
- 2009–2013: South Florida (asst.)
- 2013–2015: George Mason (asst.)
- 2016–2018: UMBC (asst.)
- 2018–2021: Delaware State

Head coaching record
- Overall: 15–67 (.183)

Eric Skeeters is an American college basketball coach who was most recently head coach of the Delaware State Hornets men's basketball team.

== Playing career ==
Skeeters played basketball and lacrosse at Catonsville CC, where he led the region in assists in 1990.

== Coaching career ==
After obtaining his associate degree, Skeeters enrolled at Coppin State while also beginning his coaching career as an assistant coach and junior varsity head coach at St. Frances Academy in Baltimore. He stayed in that position from 1992 to 1996, landing on the coaching staff at Coppin State under Fang Mitchell. Skeeters was on the Eagles staff that upset second-seeded South Carolina as a 15-seed in the 1997 NCAA tournament, and continued on with Coppin State until 1999 when he accepted an assistant coaching position at Youngstown State. After Youngstown State, Skeeters joined Seth Greenberg's coaching staff at Virginia Tech for one season before making assistant coaching stops at Towson, South Florida and George Mason until landing on fellow former Virginia Tech assistant coach Ryan Odom's staff at UMBC in 2016.

In 2018, Skeeters was on the Retrievers coaching staff that became the first 16-seed to defeat a one-seed in the 2018 NCAA tournament with a 74–54 win over Virginia.

On July 25, 2018 Skeeters was named the 16th head coach in Delaware State history, replacing Keith Walker.

On April 1, 2021, Delaware State and Skeeters parted ways after 3 seasons.

== Head coaching record ==
Record table
Season	Team	Overall	Conference	Standing	Postseason
Delaware State Hornets (Mid-Eastern Athletic Conference) (2018–2021)
2018–19	Delaware State	6–25	2–14	12th	
2019–20	Delaware State	6–26	4–12	T–9th	
2020–21	Delaware State	3–16	1–11	4th (Northern)	
Delaware State:		15–67 (.183)	7–37 (.159)		
Total:		15–67 (.183)			
