= 2018–19 Florida A&M Rattlers basketball team =

American college basketball season

2018–19 Florida A&M Rattlers basketball
- Conference: Mid-Eastern Athletic Conference
- Record: 12–19 (9–7 MEAC)
- Head coach: Robert McCullum (2nd season)
- Assistant coaches: Carlos Briggs; Jarrett Stephens
- Home arena: Teaching Gym

2018–19 MEAC men's basketball standings
| | Conf. | | | | Overall |
| Team | W | | L | PCT | W | | L | PCT |
|---|---|---|---|---|---|---|---|---|
| Norfolk State | 14 | – | 2 | .875 | 22 | – | 14 | .611 |
| North Carolina A&T | 13 | – | 3 | .813 | 19 | – | 13 | .594 |
| North Carolina Central † | 10 | – | 6 | .625 | 18 | – | 16 | .529 |
| Howard | 10 | – | 6 | .625 | 17 | – | 17 | .500 |
| Bethune–Cookman | 9 | – | 7 | .563 | 14 | – | 17 | .452 |
| Florida A&M* | 9 | – | 7 | .563 | 12 | – | 19 | .387 |
| Savannah State | 8 | – | 8 | .500 | 11 | – | 20 | .355 |
| Coppin State | 7 | – | 9 | .438 | 8 | – | 25 | .242 |
| MD Eastern Shore | 5 | – | 11 | .313 | 7 | – | 25 | .219 |
| South Carolina State | 5 | – | 11 | .313 | 8 | – | 26 | .235 |
| Morgan State | 4 | – | 12 | .250 | 9 | – | 21 | .300 |
| Delaware State | 2 | – | 14 | .125 | 6 | – | 25 | .194 |
† 2019 MEAC tournament winner *ineligible for postseason due to APR violations

The 2018–19 Florida A&M Rattlers basketball team represented Florida A&M University in the 2018–19 NCAA Division I men's basketball season. They played their home games at the Teaching Gym in Tallahassee, Florida, and were led by second year head coach Robert McCullum as members of the Mid-Eastern Athletic Conference. Florida A&M is ineligible for postseason play due to failure to meet the APR multi-year threshold. They finished the season 12–19 overall, 9–7 in MEAC play, finishing in a tie for fifth place.

== Previous season ==
The Rattlers finished the 2017–18 season 9–25, 7–9 in MEAC play to finish in a tie three-way tie for seventh place. As the No. 9 seed in the MEAC tournament, they defeated Howard before losing to Hampton in the quarterfinals.

== Roster ==
2018–19 Florida A&M Rattlers men's basketball team
Players
Coaches

| Pos. | # | Name | Height | Weight | Year | Previous school | Hometown |
|---|---|---|---|---|---|---|---|
| SF | 0 | Tracy Hector Jr. | 6 ft 5 in (1.96 m) | 220 lb (100 kg) | Jr | South Georgia State College | Jonesboro, GA |
| G | 2 | Kamron Reaves | 6 ft 2 in (1.88 m) | 170 lb (77 kg) | So | Centennial | Champaign, IL |
| G | 3 | M. J. Randolph | 6 ft 4 in (1.93 m) | 165 lb (75 kg) | Fr | Booker T. Washington | Pensacola, FL |
| G | 4 | Rod Melton Jr. | 6 ft 1 in (1.85 m) | 180 lb (82 kg) | Jr | Lawson State CC | Dothan, AL |
| G | 5 | Nasir Core | 6 ft 3 in (1.91 m) | 210 lb (95 kg) | Jr | Freedom | Tampa, FL |
| G | 10 | Richard Anderson | 6 ft 3 in (1.91 m) | 190 lb (86 kg) | Jr | Seminole State College (OK) | Midwest City, OK |
| G | 11 | Gabriel Steele | 6 ft 1 in (1.85 m) | 175 lb (79 kg) | Jr | Pasco–Hernando State College | Panama City, FL |
| G | 20 | Brendon Myles | 6 ft 4 in (1.93 m) | 185 lb (84 kg) | Jr | Whitefield Academy (GA) | Atlanta, GA |
| G | 21 | Justin Ravenel | 6 ft 1 in (1.85 m) | 185 lb (84 kg) | Sr | Greenforest | Lithonia, GA |
| G | 22 | Dexter Smith | 6 ft 4 in (1.93 m) | 185 lb (84 kg) | Jr | Shawnee CC | Chicago, IL |
| F | 23 | Bryce Moragne | 6 ft 5 in (1.96 m) | 200 lb (91 kg) | So | Hillsborough | Tampa, FL |
| PF | 24 | Ifeanyi Umezurike | 6 ft 9 in (2.06 m) | 250 lb (113 kg) | RS Jr | Saint Francis | Lagos, Nigeria |
| C | 25 | DJ Jones | 6 ft 9 in (2.06 m) | 200 lb (91 kg) | RS So | Tulane | Brusly, LA |
| F | 30 | Randall Leath Jr. | 6 ft 8 in (2.03 m) | 205 lb (93 kg) | Fr | Charter School of Wilmington | Clearwater, FL |
| C | 34 | Isaiah Martin | 7 ft 0 in (2.13 m) | 215 lb (98 kg) | Sr | Lamar CC | Denver, CO |
| F | 35 | Hnric Murray Jr. | 6 ft 5 in (1.96 m) | 218 lb (99 kg) | Fr | Potters' House Christian Academy | Orlando, FL |

Head coach

- Robert McCullum (Birmingham–Southern)

Assistant coach(es)

- Carlos Briggs (Baylor)
- Jarrett Stephens (LeMoyne-Owen)

Legend

- (C) Team captain
- (S) Suspended
- (I) Ineligible
- (W) Walk-on
- Injured
- Current redshirt

Roster
Last update: January 7, 2019

== Schedule and results ==
| Date time, TV | Rank^{#} | Opponent^{#} | Result | Record | Site (attendance) city, state |
Exhibition
| November 1, 2018*; 7:00 pm | | Edward Waters | W 62–57 | | Teaching Gym; Tallahassee, Florida |
Non-conference regular season
| November 6, 2018*; 7:00 pm, ESPN+ | | at Jacksonville | W 65–50 | 1–0 | Swisher Gymnasium (1,391); Jacksonville, Florida |
| November 10, 2018*; 1:00 pm | | Tuskegee | W 62–55 | 2–0 | Teaching Gym (11,897); Tallahassee, Florida |
| November 13, 2018*; 2:00 pm, CBSSN | | vs. Campbell; Jamaica Classic | L 59–66 | 2–1 | Montego Bay Convention Centre; Montego Bay, Jamaica |
| November 18, 2018*; 9:00 pm, CBSSN | | vs. Central Connecticut; Jamaica Classic | L 75–89 | 2–2 | Montego Bay Convention Centre (1,425); Montego Bay, Jamaica |
| November 21, 2018*; 7:00 pm | | at South Florida | L 59–69 | 2–3 | Yuengling Center (2,595); Tampa, Florida |
| November 24, 2018*; 10:30 pm | | at Loyola Marymount | L 63–71 | 2–4 | Gersten Pavilion (685); Los Angeles, California |
| November 29, 2018*; 8:00 pm, ESPN+ | | at North Florida | L 62–81 | 2–5 | UNF Arena (2,041); Jacksonville, Florida |
| December 1, 2018*; 8:00 pm, ESPN+ | | at South Alabama | L 57–66 | 2–6 | Mitchell Center (2,114); Mobile, Alabama |
| December 3, 2018*; 8:30 pm, FS1 | | at DePaul | L 50–65 | 2–7 | Wintrust Arena (3,763); Chicago, Illinois |
| December 6, 2018*; 7:00 pm | | Fort Valley State | W 80–58 | 3–7 | Teaching Gym (1,293); Tallahassee, Florida |
| December 9, 2018*; 2:00 pm, ACCNE | | at Georgia Tech | L 40–73 | 3–8 | McCamish Pavilion (4,951); Atlanta, Georgia |
| December 17, 2018*; 8:00 pm, P12N | | at Utah | L 64–93 | 3–9 | Jon M. Huntsman Center (10,887); Salt Lake City, Utah |
| December 18, 2018*; 6:00 pm, P12N | | at Oregon | L 64–71 | 3–10 | Matthew Knight Arena (6,909); Eugene, Oregon |
| December 21, 2018*; 8:00 pm | | at Portland | L 39–54 | 3–11 | Chiles Center (1,417); Portland, Oregon |
| December 29, 2018*; 1:00 pm, ESPN3 | | at Memphis | L 65–96 | 3–12 | FedEx Forum (14,201); Memphis, Tennessee |
MEAC regular season
| January 5, 2019; 4:00 pm | | at Howard | W 82–72 | 4–12 (1–0) | Burr Gymnasium; Washington, D.C. |
| January 7, 2019; 8:00 pm | | at Norfolk State | L 62–72 | 4–13 (1–1) | Joseph G. Echols Memorial Hall; Norfolk, Virginia |
| January 12, 2019; 4:00 pm | | Savannah State | W 69–64 | 5–13 (2–1) | Teaching Gym; Tallahassee, Florida |
| January 19, 2019; 4:00 pm | | Maryland Eastern Shore | L 58–60 ^{OT} | 5–14 (2–2) | Teaching Gym (1,565); Tallahassee, Florida |
| January 21, 2019; 4:00 pm | | Delaware State | W 60–47 | 6–14 (3–2) | Teaching Gym (1,648); Tallahassee, Florida |
| January 26, 2019; 4:00 pm | | at Coppin State | | | Physical Education Complex; Baltimore, Maryland |
| January 28, 2019; 7:30 pm | | at Morgan State | | | Talmadge L. Hill Field House; Baltimore, Maryland |
| February 2, 2019; 6:00 pm | | North Carolina A&T | | | Teaching Gym; Tallahassee, Florida |
| February 4, 2019; 7:30 pm | | North Carolina Central | | | Teaching Gym; Tallahassee, Florida |
| February 9, 2019; 4:00 pm | | Howard | | | Teaching Gym; Tallahassee, Florida |
| February 11, 2019; 7:30 pm | | Norfolk State | | | Teaching Gym; Tallahassee, Florida |
| February 16, 2019; 8:00 pm | | at Savannah State | | | Tiger Arena; Savannah, Georgia |
| February 18, 2019; 7:00 pm | | at South Carolina State | | | SHM Memorial Center; Orangeburg, South Carolina |
| February 23, 2019; 4:00 pm | | at Bethune–Cookman | | | Moore Gymnasium; Daytona Beach, Florida |
| March 2, 2019; 4:00 pm | | at North Carolina A&T | | | Corbett Sports Center; Greensboro, North Carolina |
| March 7, 2019; 7:30 pm | | Bethune–Cookman | | | Teaching Gym; Tallahassee, Florida |
*Non-conference game. ^{#}Rankings from AP Poll. (#) Tournament seedings in parentheses. All times are in Eastern.
