= 2019–20 North Carolina A&T Aggies men's basketball team =

American college basketball season

2019–20 North Carolina A&T Aggies men's basketball
- Conference: Mid-Eastern Athletic Conference
- Record: 16–15 (12–4 MEAC)
- Head coach: Jay Joyner (4th season); Willie Jones
- Assistant coaches: Ahmad Dorsett; Phillip Shumpert
- Home arena: Corbett Sports Center

2019–20 MEAC men's basketball standings
	Conf.				Overall
Team	W		L	PCT	W		L	PCT
North Carolina Central	13	–	3	.813	18	–	13	.581
North Carolina A&T	12	–	4	.750	16	–	15	.516
Norfolk State	12	–	4	.750	16	–	15	.516
Florida A&M*	10	–	6	.625	12	–	15	.444
Bethune–Cookman	10	–	6	.625	16	–	14	.533
Morgan State	9	–	7	.563	15	–	16	.484
Coppin State	7	–	9	.438	11	–	20	.355
South Carolina State	6	–	10	.375	11	–	18	.379
MD Eastern Shore	4	–	12	.250	5	–	27	.156
Delaware State	4	–	12	.250	6	–	26	.188
Howard	1	–	15	.063	4	–	29	.121
* Ineligible for postseason due to improper certification of student-athletes Note: The 2020 MEAC tournament was canceled during the quarterfinals due to the COVID-19 pandemic.

The 2019–20 North Carolina A&T Aggies men's basketball team represent North Carolina Agricultural and Technical State University in the 2019–20 NCAA Division I men's basketball season. The Aggies, led by 4th-year head coach Jay Joyner, play their home games at the Corbett Sports Center in Greensboro, North Carolina as members of the Mid-Eastern Athletic Conference (MEAC).

The Aggies finished the season 16–15, 12–4 in MEAC play, to finish in a tie for second place in conference standings.

== Previous season ==
The Aggies finished the 2018–19 season 19–13 overall, 13–3 in MEAC play, finishing in second place. In the MEAC tournament, they defeated Coppin State in the quarterfinals before falling to North Carolina Central in the semifinals.

== Roster ==
2019–20 North Carolina A&T Aggies men's basketball team
Players
Coaches

Pos.	#	Name	Height	Weight	Year	Hometown
G	0	Andre Jackson	6 ft 4 in (1.93 m)	175 lb (79 kg)	Sr	Charlotte, NC
G	2	Fred Jr. Cleveland	5 ft 10 in (1.78 m)	155 lb (70 kg)	Fr	Chicago, IL
SF	3	Shayne Scruggs	6 ft 7 in (2.01 m)	210 lb (95 kg)	Fr	Lansing, MI
G	4	Jibril McCormick	6 ft 6 in (1.98 m)	210 lb (95 kg)	Fr	Charlotte, NC
G	11	Tyler Maye	6 ft 2 in (1.88 m)	170 lb (77 kg)	Jr	Farmville, NC
G	12	Kwe Parker	6 ft 2 in (1.88 m)	181 lb (82 kg)	RS Jr	Fayetteville, NC
G	13	Kameron Langley	6 ft 2 in (1.88 m)	205 lb (93 kg)	Jr	Greensboro, NC
C	14	Harry Morrice	6 ft 11 in (2.11 m)	235 lb (107 kg)	Fr	Dundee, Scotland
G	15	Darus Maddox	6 ft 0 in (1.83 m)	155 lb (70 kg)	Jr	Lusby, MD
F	21	Ron Jackson Jr.	6 ft 8 in (2.03 m)	205 lb (93 kg)	Sr	Clay County, FL
PF	23	Devin Haygood	6 ft 8 in (2.03 m)	180 lb (82 kg)	RS Sr	Ypsilanti, MI
G	24	Elijah Joyner	6 ft 5 in (1.96 m)	175 lb (79 kg)	RS Fr	Greensboro, NC
F	25	Webster Filmore	6 ft 6 in (1.98 m)	200 lb (91 kg)	So	Charlotte, NC
G/F	35	Tyrone Lyons	6 ft 6 in (1.98 m)	180 lb (82 kg)	So	Amityville, NY

Head coach

- Jay Joyner (South Carolina State)

Assistant coach(es)

- Willie Jones (South Carolina State)
- Ahmad Dorsett (George Mason)
- Phillip Shumpert (United States Sports Academy)

Legend

- (C) Team captain
- (S) Suspended
- (I) Ineligible
- (W) Walk-on
- Injured
- Current redshirt

Roster
Last update: September 20, 2025

== Schedule and results ==
Date time, TV	Rank^{#}	Opponent^{#}	Result	Record	Site (attendance) city, state
Non-conference regular season
November 5, 2019*; 7:00 p.m., ESPN3		at UNC Greensboro; Battle of Market Street	L 50–83	0–1	Greensboro Coliseum (8,131); Greensboro, NC
November 8, 2019*; 7:00 p.m.		Charleston Southern	W 63–49	1–1	Corbett Sports Center (1,904); Greensboro, NC
November 12, 2019*; 7:00 p.m., ESPN+		at Western Carolina	L 64–90	1–2	Ramsey Center (1,206); Cullowhee, NC
November 15, 2019*; 9:00 p.m.		at No. 17 Utah State	L 54–81	1–3	Smith Spectrum (8,864); Logan, UT
November 19, 2019*; 8:00 p.m.		at North Texas	L 60–80	1–4	The Super Pit (2,129); Denton, TX
November 22, 2019*; 11:30 a.m., CBSSN		vs. Nicholls; Jamaica Classic	W 66–54	2–4	Montego Bay Convention Centre; Montego Bay, Jamaica
November 24, 2019*; 12:00 p.m., CBSSN		vs. Eastern Michigan; Jamaica Classic	L 54–58	2–5	Montego Bay Convention Centre; Montego Bay, Jamaica
November 30, 2019*; 2:00 p.m.		Jacksonville	L 45–61	2–6	Corbett Sports Center (956); Greensboro, NC
December 4, 2019*; 7:00 p.m.		Longwood	W 52–41	3–6	Corbett Sports Center (1,087); Greensboro, NC
December 7, 2019*; 2:00 p.m., ESPN+		at Bradley	L 52–83	3–7	Carver Arena (5,087); Peoria, IL
December 16, 2019*; 9:00 p.m.		at UTEP; Sun Bowl Invitational	L 54–72	3–8	Don Haskins Center (5,969); El Paso, TX
December 17, 2019*; 7:00 p.m.		vs. Kent State; Sun Bowl Invitational	L 71–85 ^{OT}	3–9	Don Haskins Center (6,934); El Paso, TX
December 21, 2019*; 12:00 p.m., ACCN		at Wake Forest	L 64–76	3–10	LJVM Coliseum (5,156); Winston-Salem, NC
December 29, 2019*; 2:00 p.m., ESPNU		at Illinois	L 64–95	3–11	State Farm Center (13,676); Champaign, IL
January 3, 2020*; 2:00 p.m.		Mid-Atlantic Christian	W 123–61	4–11	Corbett Sports Center (1,007); Greensboro, NC
MEAC regular season
January 6, 2020; 7:30 p.m.		Florida A&M	W 97–90 ^{OT}	5–11 (1–0)	Corbett Sports Center (1,412); Greensboro, NC
January 11, 2020; 4:30 p.m.		at Maryland Eastern Shore	W 91–53	6–11 (2–0)	Hytche Athletic Center (555); Princess Anne, MD
January 13, 2020; 7:30 p.m.		at Delaware State	W 98–77	7–11 (3–0)	Memorial Hall (872); Dover, DE
January 18, 2020; 4:00 p.m.		at Coppin State	L 75–79	7–12 (3–1)	Physical Education Complex (551); Baltimore, MD
January 20, 2020; 7:30 p.m.		at Morgan State	W 76–70	8–12 (4–1)	Talmadge L. Hill Field House (1,103); Baltimore, MD
January 25, 2020; 4:00 p.m.		Bethune–Cookman	W 98–95	9–12 (5–1)	Corbett Sports Center (2,846); Greensboro, NC
January 27, 2020; 7:30 p.m.		Delaware State	W 82–67	10–12 (6–1)	Corbett Sports Center (3,567); Greensboro, NC
February 1, 2020; 4:00 p.m.		Norfolk State	W 74–68	11–12 (7–1)	Corbett Sports Center (4,317); Greensboro, NC
February 3, 2020; 7:30 p.m.		South Carolina State	W 78–63	12–12 (8–1)	Corbett Sports Center (4,139); Greensboro, NC
February 8, 2020; 4:00 p.m.		at Bethune–Cookman	L 73–78	12–13 (8–2)	Moore Gymnasium (919); Daytona Beach, FL
February 10, 2020; 8:00 p.m.		at Florida A&M	L 60–79	12–14 (8–3)	Teaching Gym (1,987); Tallahassee, FL
February 17, 2020; 7:00 p.m., ESPNU		North Carolina Central	W 77–60	13–14 (9–3)	Corbett Sports Center (5,700); Greensboro, NC
February 22, 2020; 4:00 p.m.		Howard	W 71–67	14–14 (10–3)	Corbett Sports Center (3,780); Greensboro, NC
February 24, 2020; 7:30 p.m.		Maryland Eastern Shore	W 83–62	15–14 (11–3)	Corbett Sports Center (2,853); Greensboro, NC
March 2, 2020; 7:30 p.m.		at South Carolina State	W 76–65	16–14 (12–3)	SHM Memorial Center; Orangeburg, SC
March 5, 2020; 7:30 p.m., ESPNU		at North Carolina Central	L 80–86	16–15 (12–4)	McDougald–McLendon Arena (3,026); Durham, NC
MEAC tournament
March 11, 2020; 8:00 p.m., FloSports	(2)	vs. Quarterfinal	Canceled		Norfolk Scope; Norfolk, VA
*Non-conference game. ^{#}Rankings from AP poll. (#) Tournament seedings in parentheses. All times are in Eastern.
