= 2019–20 Florida A&M Rattlers basketball team =

American college basketball season

2019–20 Florida A&M Rattlers basketball
- Conference: Mid-Eastern Athletic Conference
- Record: 12–15 (10–6 MEAC)
- Head coach: Robert McCullum (3rd season)
- Assistant coaches: Willie Powers; Jarrett Stephens
- Home arena: Teaching Gym

2019–20 MEAC men's basketball standings
	Conf.				Overall
Team	W		L	PCT	W		L	PCT
North Carolina Central	13	–	3	.813	18	–	13	.581
North Carolina A&T	12	–	4	.750	16	–	15	.516
Norfolk State	12	–	4	.750	16	–	15	.516
Florida A&M*	10	–	6	.625	12	–	15	.444
Bethune–Cookman	10	–	6	.625	16	–	14	.533
Morgan State	9	–	7	.563	15	–	16	.484
Coppin State	7	–	9	.438	11	–	20	.355
South Carolina State	6	–	10	.375	11	–	18	.379
MD Eastern Shore	4	–	12	.250	5	–	27	.156
Delaware State	4	–	12	.250	6	–	26	.188
Howard	1	–	15	.063	4	–	29	.121
* Ineligible for postseason due to improper certification of student-athletes Note: The 2020 MEAC tournament was canceled during the quarterfinals due to the COVID-19 pandemic.

The 2019–20 Florida A&M Rattlers basketball team represented Florida A&M University in the 2019–20 NCAA Division I men's basketball season. The Rattlers, led by third-year head coach Robert McCullum, played their home games at the Teaching Gym in Tallahassee, Florida as members of the Mid-Eastern Athletic Conference. They finished the season 12–15, 10–6 in MEAC play to finish in a tie for fourth place. Florida A&M was ineligible for postseason play due to improper certification of student-athletes.

== Previous season ==
The Rattlers finished the 2018–19 season 12–19 overall, 9–7 in MEAC play, finishing in a tie for fifth place. They were ineligible for postseason play due to failure to meet the APR multi-year threshold.

== Roster ==
2019–20 Florida A&M Rattlers men's basketball team
Players
Coaches

Pos.	#	Name	Height	Weight	Year	Hometown
G	1	Dexter Smith	6 ft 4 in (1.93 m)	185 lb (84 kg)	RS Jr	Chicago, Illinois
G	2	Kamron Reaves	6 ft 2 in (1.88 m)	170 lb (77 kg)	Jr	Champaign, Illinois
G	3	M. J. Randolph	6 ft 4 in (1.93 m)	170 lb (77 kg)	So	Pensacola, Florida
G	4	Rod Melton, Jr.	6 ft 1 in (1.85 m)	180 lb (82 kg)	Sr	Dothan, Alabama
G	5	Nasir Core	6 ft 3 in (1.91 m)	210 lb (95 kg)	Sr	Tampa, Florida
F	10	Andrew Dansoh	6 ft 7 in (2.01 m)	200 lb (91 kg)	Fr	Tampa, Florida
F	11	Hnric Murray, Jr.	6 ft 5 in (1.96 m)	215 lb (98 kg)	So	Orlando, Florida
G	13	Jamir Williams	6 ft 4 in (1.93 m)	165 lb (75 kg)	Fr	Newnan, Georgia
G	20	Brendon Myles	6 ft 4 in (1.93 m)	185 lb (84 kg)	Sr	Atlanta, Georgia
C	22	Evins Desir	6 ft 8 in (2.03 m)	300 lb (136 kg)	Jr	Port-au-Prince, Haiti
F	23	Bryce Moragne	6 ft 5 in (1.96 m)	200 lb (91 kg)	Jr	Tampa, Florida
C	24	Ifeanyi Umezurike	6 ft 9 in (2.06 m)	240 lb (109 kg)	RS Sr	Lagos, Nigeria
F	25	DJ Jones	6 ft 9 in (2.06 m)	200 lb (91 kg)	RS Jr	Brusly, Louisiana
F	30	Randall Leath, Jr.	6 ft 8 in (2.03 m)	205 lb (93 kg)	So	Clearwater, Florida

Head coach

- Robert McCullum (Birmingham–Southern)

Assistant coach(es)

- Willie Powers (Georgia Southern)
- Jarrett Stephens (LeMoyne–Owen)

Legend

- (C) Team captain
- (S) Suspended
- (I) Ineligible
- (W) Walk-on
- Injured
- Current redshirt

Roster
Last update: January 2, 2020

== Schedule and results ==
Date time, TV	Opponent	Result	Record	Site (attendance) city, state
Non-conference regular season
November 5, 2019*; 11:00 pm, P12N	at USC	L 48–77	0–1	Galen Center (3,021); Los Angeles, CA
November 8, 2019*; 11:59 pm	at Hawaii; Rainbow Classic	L 52–65	0–2	Stan Sheriff Center (5,093); Honolulu, HI
November 10, 2019*; 7:30 pm	vs. Pacific; Rainbow Classic	L 54–76	0–3	Stan Sheriff Center (5,200); Honolulu, HI
November 11, 2019*; 9:30 pm	vs. South Dakota; Rainbow Classic	L 82–85	0–4	Stan Sheriff Center (4,935); Honolulu, HI
November 23, 2019*; 12:00 pm, FS2	at No. 13 Seton Hall	L 51–87	0–5	Prudential Center (9,656); Newark, NJ
December 2, 2019*; 8:00 pm, ESPN+	at Kansas State	L 58–76	0–6	Bramlage Coliseum (7,417); Manhattan, KS
December 4, 2019*; 7:00 pm, SECN	at No. 21 Tennessee	L 43–72	0–7	Thompson–Boling Arena (17,187); Knoxville, TN
December 16, 2019*; 10:00 pm	at Portland	L 60–66	0–8	Chiles Center (1,073); Portland, OR
December 19, 2019*; 10:30 pm, P12N	at Washington State	L 73–87	0–9	Beasley Coliseum (1,987); Pullman, WA
December 21, 2019*; 10:00 pm	at Seattle	W 71–57	1–9	Redhawk Center (806); Seattle, WA
December 31, 2019*; 7:00 pm	at Iowa State	W 70–68	2–9	Hilton Coliseum (13,411); Ames, IA
MEAC regular season
January 4, 2020; 4:00 pm	at North Carolina Central	L 45–61	2–10 (0–1)	McDougald–McLendon Arena (988); Durham, NC
January 6, 2020; 7:30 pm	at North Carolina A&T	L 90–97 ^{OT}	2–11 (0–2)	Corbett Sports Center (1,412); Greensboro, NC
January 11, 2020; 4:30 pm	Morgan State	W 77–68	3–11 (1–2)	Teaching Gym (1,879); Tallahassee, FL
January 13, 2020; 8:00 pm	Coppin State	W 65–54	4–11 (2–2)	Teaching Gym (473); Tallahassee, FL
January 18, 2020; 4:00 pm	at South Carolina State	L 65–81	4–12 (2–3)	SHM Memorial Center (499); Orangeburg, SC
January 20, 2020; 4:45 pm	North Carolina Central	W 66–57	5–12 (3–3)	Teaching Gym (407); Tallahassee, FL
January 25, 2020; 7:30 pm	at Howard	W 87–83	6–12 (4–3)	Burr Gymnasium (1,906); Washington, D.C.
January 27, 2020; 7:30 pm, ESPNU	at Norfolk State	L 67–95	6–13 (4–4)	Joseph G. Echols Memorial Hall (3,016); Norfolk, VA
February 1, 2020; 4:00 pm	Bethune–Cookman	W 73–67	7–13 (5–4)	Teaching Gym (5,013); Tallahassee, FL
February 8, 2020; 4:00 pm	Howard	W 82–78 ^{OT}	8–13 (6–4)	Teaching Gym (2,917); Tallahassee, FL
February 10, 2020; 8:00 pm	North Carolina A&T	W 79–60	9–13 (7–4)	Teaching Gym (1,987); Tallahassee, FL
February 15, 2020; 2:00 pm	at Delaware State	W 97–95 ^{2OT}	10–13 (8–4)	Memorial Hall (571); Dover, DE
February 17, 2020; 7:30 pm	at Maryland Eastern Shore	L 71–81	10–14 (8–5)	Hytche Athletic Center (660); Princess Anne, MD
February 22, 2020; 4:00 pm	Norfolk State	W 66–63	11–14 (9–5)	Teaching Gym (1,717); Tallahassee, FL
February 24, 2020; 8:00 pm	South Carolina State	W 62–56	12–14 (10–5)	Teaching Gym (1,793); Tallahassee, FL
March 5, 2020; 7:30 pm	at Bethune–Cookman	L 70–72 ^{OT}	12–15 (10–6)	Moore Gymnasium; Daytona Beach, FL
*Non-conference game. ^{#}Rankings from AP Poll. (#) Tournament seedings in parentheses. All times are in Eastern.
