= 2019–20 Bethune–Cookman Wildcats men's basketball team =

American college basketball season

2019–20 Bethune–Cookman Wildcats men's basketball
- Conference: Mid-Eastern Athletic Conference
- Record: 16–14 (10–6 MEAC)
- Head coach: Ryan Ridder (3rd season)
- Associate head coach: Dominique Taylor
- Assistant coaches: Denver Cobb; Donald Reyes
- Home arena: Moore Gymnasium

2019–20 MEAC men's basketball standings
| | Conf. | | | | Overall |
| Team | W | | L | PCT | W | | L | PCT |
|---|---|---|---|---|---|---|---|---|
| North Carolina Central | 13 | – | 3 | .813 | 18 | – | 13 | .581 |
| North Carolina A&T | 12 | – | 4 | .750 | 16 | – | 15 | .516 |
| Norfolk State | 12 | – | 4 | .750 | 16 | – | 15 | .516 |
| Florida A&M* | 10 | – | 6 | .625 | 12 | – | 15 | .444 |
| Bethune–Cookman | 10 | – | 6 | .625 | 16 | – | 14 | .533 |
| Morgan State | 9 | – | 7 | .563 | 15 | – | 16 | .484 |
| Coppin State | 7 | – | 9 | .438 | 11 | – | 20 | .355 |
| South Carolina State | 6 | – | 10 | .375 | 11 | – | 18 | .379 |
| MD Eastern Shore | 4 | – | 12 | .250 | 5 | – | 27 | .156 |
| Delaware State | 4 | – | 12 | .250 | 6 | – | 26 | .188 |
| Howard | 1 | – | 15 | .063 | 4 | – | 29 | .121 |
* Ineligible for postseason due to improper certification of student-athletes Note: The 2020 MEAC tournament was canceled during the quarterfinals due to the COVID-19 pandemic.

The 2019–20 Bethune–Cookman Wildcats men's basketball team represent Bethune–Cookman University in the 2019–20 NCAA Division I men's basketball season. The Wildcats, led by 3rd-year head coach Ryan Ridder, play their home games at Moore Gymnasium in Daytona Beach, Florida as members of the Mid-Eastern Athletic Conference.

== Previous season ==
The Wildcats finished the 2018–19 season 14–17 overall, 9–7 in MEAC play, finishing in a tie for fifth place. The team received a No. 5 seed in the MEAC tournament, where they were defeated 71–80 in the quarterfinals by No. 5 seed Howard.

== Roster ==
2019–20 Bethune–Cookman Wildcats men's basketball team
Players
Coaches

| Pos. | # | Name | Height | Weight | Year | Hometown |
|---|---|---|---|---|---|---|
| G | 0 | Leon Redd | 6 ft 0 in (1.83 m) | 185 lb (84 kg) | Sr | Grand Rapids, Michigan |
| G | 1 | Malik Maitland | 5 ft 9 in (1.75 m) | 175 lb (79 kg) | Sr | Daytona Beach, Florida |
| G | 2 | Houston Smith | 6 ft 4 in (1.93 m) | 210 lb (95 kg) | Sr | Columbus, Ohio |
| G/F | 3 | Wali Parks | 6 ft 6 in (1.98 m) | 215 lb (98 kg) | Sr | Iowa City, Iowa |
| G | 4 | Jordan Preaster | 6 ft 5 in (1.96 m) | 190 lb (86 kg) | Fr | Orlando, Florida |
| G | 5 | Jeremiah Gilyard | 6 ft 2 in (1.88 m) | 180 lb (82 kg) | So | Palatka, Florida |
| F | 10 | Cletrell Pope | 6 ft 9 in (2.06 m) | 212 lb (96 kg) | Sr | Northport, Alabama |
| G | 11 | Jeff Coulanges | 6 ft 3 in (1.91 m) | 190 lb (86 kg) | Sr | Trenton, New Jersey |
| G | 12 | Danny Harris, Jr. | 6 ft 0 in (1.83 m) | 185 lb (84 kg) | Sr | Fort Lauderdale, Florida |
| G | 13 | Joe French | 6 ft 5 in (1.96 m) | 180 lb (82 kg) | Fr | Orlando, Florida |
| G | 21 | Matthew Mondesir | 6 ft 5 in (1.96 m) | 200 lb (91 kg) | So | Los Angeles, California |
| G/F | 22 | Isaiah Bailey | 6 ft 6 in (1.98 m) | 190 lb (86 kg) | Sr | Compton, California |
| F | 23 | Justyn King | 6 ft 7 in (2.01 m) | 225 lb (102 kg) | Fr | Plant City, Florida |
| F | 32 | Zen Goodridge | 6 ft 7 in (2.01 m) | 250 lb (113 kg) | RS So | Orlando, Florida |
| F | 33 | Alex Ismail | 6 ft 11 in (2.11 m) | 265 lb (120 kg) | Jr | Dearborn Heights, Michigan |

Head coach

- Ryan Ridder (Embry–Riddle)

Assistant coach(es)

- Dominique Taylor (East Texas A&M)
- Denver Cobb (Embry–Riddle)
- Donald Reyes (LSU)

Legend

- (C) Team captain
- (S) Suspended
- (I) Ineligible
- (W) Walk-on
- Injured
- Current redshirt

Roster
Last update: December 28, 2019

== Schedule and results ==
| Date time, TV | Rank^{#} | Opponent^{#} | Result | Record | Site (attendance) city, state |
Non-conference regular season
| November 6, 2019*; 7:00 pm | | Johnson University (FL) | W 110–68 | 1–0 | Moore Gymnasium (801); Daytona Beach, FL |
| November 9, 2019*; 8:00 pm, FSSW+ | | at No. 13 Texas Tech | L 44–79 | 1–1 | United Supermarkets Arena (15,098); Lubbock, TX |
| November 11, 2019*; 8:30 pm | | at Omaha | L 61–90 | 1–2 | Baxter Arena (2,112); Omaha, NE |
| November 15, 2019*; 7:00 pm | | Trinity Baptist | W 100–42 | 2–2 | Moore Gymnasium (557); Daytona Beach, Florida |
| November 22, 2019*; 1:00 pm | | at Incarnate Word; San Antonio Classic | W 83–58 | 3–2 | McDermott Center (125); San Antonio, TX |
| November 23, 2019*; 1:00 pm | | vs. Eastern Illinois; San Antonio Classic | W 66–63 | 4–2 | McDermott Center (126); San Antonio, TX |
| November 24, 2019*; 1:00 pm | | vs. St. Francis (IL); San Antonio Classic | W 74–70 | 5–2 | McDermott Center (72); San Antonio, TX |
| December 1, 2019*; 6:00 pm, ACCNX | | at Georgia Tech | L 65–68 | 5–3 | McCamish Pavilion (4,552); Atlanta, GA |
| December 3, 2019*; 7:00 pm, ESPN+ | | at Stetson | L 67–72 | 5–4 | Edmunds Center; DeLand, FL |
| December 7, 2019*; 6:00 pm, ESPN+ | | at Jacksonville | L 60–82 | 5–5 | Swisher Gymnasium (811); Jacksonville, FL |
| December 14, 2019*; 10:00 pm, WAC DN | | at California Baptist | L 68–87 | 5–6 | CBU Events Center; Riverside, CA |
| December 18, 2019*; 7:00 pm, ESPN3 | | at UCF | L 65–70 | 5–7 | Addition Financial Arena (4,112); Orlando, FL |
| December 21, 2019*; 1:00 pm | | Marist | W 85–56 | 6–7 | Moore Gymnasium (103); Daytona Beach, FL |
| December 29, 2019*; 7:00 pm, ESPN+ | | at Saint Louis | L 67–77 | 6–8 | Chaifetz Arena (6,723); St. Louis, MO |
MEAC regular season
| January 4, 2020; 6:30 pm | | at Norfolk State | L 72–85 | 6–9 (0–1) | Joseph G. Echols Memorial Hall (918); Norfolk, VA |
| January 6, 2020; 6:30 pm | | at Howard | W 102–73 | 7–9 (1–1) | Burr Gymnasium (289); Washington, D.C. |
| January 11, 2020; 4:15 pm | | Coppin State | W 85–80 | 8–9 (2–1) | Moore Gymnasium (376); Daytona Beach, FL |
| January 13, 2020; 7:30 pm | | Morgan State | W 85–78 | 9–9 (3–1) | Moore Gymnasium (903); Daytona Beach, FL |
| January 18, 2020; 4:00 pm | | North Carolina Central | L 59–86 | 9–10 (3–2) | Moore Gymnasium (855); Daytona Beach, FL |
| January 25, 2020; 4:00 pm | | at North Carolina A&T | L 95–98 | 9–11 (3–3) | Corbett Sports Center (2,846); Greensboro, NC |
| January 27, 2020; 7:30 pm | | at South Carolina State | W 78–74 | 10–11 (4–3) | SHM Memorial Center; Orangeburg, SC |
| February 1, 2020; 4:00 pm | | at Florida A&M | L 67–73 | 10–12 (4–4) | Teaching Gym (5,013); Tallahassee, FL |
| February 8, 2020; 4:00 pm | | North Carolina A&T | W 78–73 | 11–12 (5–4) | Moore Gymnasium (919); Daytona Beach, FL |
| February 10, 2020; 7:30 pm | | Howard | W 87–68 | 12–12 (6–4) | Moore Gymnasium (870); Daytona Beach, FL |
| February 15, 2020; 4:00 pm | | at Maryland Eastern Shore | L 58–66 | 12–13 (6–5) | Hytche Athletic Center (600); Princess Anne, MD |
| February 17, 2020; 7:30 pm | | at Delaware State | W 71–70 | 13–13 (7–5) | Memorial Hall (958); Dover, DE |
| February 22, 2020; 4:00 pm | | South Carolina State | W 69–65 ^{OT} | 14–13 (8–5) | Moore Gymnasium (804); Daytona Beach, FL |
| February 24, 2020; 7:30 pm | | Norfolk State | W 78–55 | 15–13 (9–5) | Moore Gymnasium (805); Daytona Beach, FL |
| March 2, 2020; 7:30 pm | | at North Carolina Central | L 68–71 ^{OT} | 15–14 (9–6) | McDougald–McLendon Arena (1,338); Durham, NC |
| March 5, 2020; 7:30 pm | | Florida A&M | W 72–70 ^{OT} | 16–14 (10–6) | Moore Gymnasium; Daytona Beach, FL |
MEAC tournament
| March 12, 2020; 6:00 pm, FloSports | (4) | vs. (5) Morgan State; Quarterfinals | MEAC Tournament Canceled | | Norfolk Scope; Norfolk, VA |
*Non-conference game. ^{#}Rankings from AP Poll. (#) Tournament seedings in parentheses. All times are in Eastern.
