= 2019–20 North Carolina Central Eagles men's basketball team =

American college basketball season

2019–20 North Carolina Central Eagles men's basketball

MEAC regular season champions
- Conference: Mid-Eastern Athletic Conference
- Record: 18–13 (13–3 MEAC)
- Head coach: LeVelle Moton (11th season)
- Assistant coaches: Brian Graves; Reggie Sharp; Nigel Thomas
- Home arena: McDougald–McLendon Arena

2019–20 MEAC men's basketball standings
	Conf.				Overall
Team	W		L	PCT	W		L	PCT
North Carolina Central	13	–	3	.813	18	–	13	.581
North Carolina A&T	12	–	4	.750	16	–	15	.516
Norfolk State	12	–	4	.750	16	–	15	.516
Florida A&M*	10	–	6	.625	12	–	15	.444
Bethune–Cookman	10	–	6	.625	16	–	14	.533
Morgan State	9	–	7	.563	15	–	16	.484
Coppin State	7	–	9	.438	11	–	20	.355
South Carolina State	6	–	10	.375	11	–	18	.379
MD Eastern Shore	4	–	12	.250	5	–	27	.156
Delaware State	4	–	12	.250	6	–	26	.188
Howard	1	–	15	.063	4	–	29	.121
* Ineligible for postseason due to improper certification of student-athletes Note: The 2020 MEAC tournament was canceled during the quarterfinals due to the COVID-19 pandemic.

The 2019–20 North Carolina Central Eagles men's basketball team represented North Carolina Central University in the 2019–20 NCAA Division I men's basketball season. The Eagles, led by 11th-year head coach LeVelle Moton, played their home games at McDougald–McLendon Arena in Durham, North Carolina as members of the Mid-Eastern Athletic Conference. They finished the season 19-14, 13–3 in MEAC play, winning the MEAC regular season championship. They defeated Delaware State in the quarterfinals of the MEAC tournament. They were scheduled to play the winner of the quarterfinal matchup between Bethune–Cookman and Morgan State in the semifinals, but the remainder of the tournament was cancelled due to the ongoing COVID pandemic.

== Previous season ==
The Eagles finished the 2018–19 season 18–16 overall, 10–6 in MEAC play, finishing in 3rd place. In the MEAC tournament, they defeated Delaware State in the quarterfinals, North Carolina A&T in the semifinals, advancing to the championship game against top-seeded Norfolk State, upsetting the Spartans, winning the MEAC's automatic bid to the NCAA tournament for the third consecutive year. Also, for the third consecutive year, they received the No. 16 seed, and played in the First Four, this time losing to North Dakota State.

== Roster ==
2019–20 North Carolina Central Eagles men's basketball team
Players
Coaches

Pos.	#	Name	Height	Weight	Year	Hometown
G	1	Mike Melvin	5 ft 11 in (1.8 m)	160 lb (73 kg)	Jr	Fayetteville, North Carolina
F	2	Jibri Blount	6 ft 7 in (2.01 m)	230 lb (104 kg)	RS Sr	Pittsburgh, Pennsylvania
G	3	Ty Graves	5 ft 10 in (1.78 m)	160 lb (73 kg)	RS Jr	Greensboro, North Carolina
G	4	Joshua Dawkins	5 ft 9 in (1.75 m)	160 lb (73 kg)	Fr	Miami, Florida
G	5	Deven Palmer	6 ft 4 in (1.93 m)	180 lb (82 kg)	Jr	Hyde Park, Massachusetts
F/C	10	Evan Clayborne	6 ft 6 in (1.98 m)	230 lb (104 kg)	RS Jr	Dayton, Ohio
G	11	Randy Miller Jr.	6 ft 2 in (1.88 m)	190 lb (86 kg)	Sr	Odenton, Maryland
G	12	Jordan Perkins	6 ft 1 in (1.85 m)	190 lb (86 kg)	Jr	Greensboro, North Carolina
F/C	13	Justin Whatley	6 ft 8 in (2.03 m)	235 lb (107 kg)	RS So	Chesapeake, Virginia
F	21	Kobby Ayetey	6 ft 6 in (1.98 m)	210 lb (95 kg)	Jr	Apam, Ghana
G	22	C.J. Keyser	6 ft 3 in (1.91 m)	190 lb (86 kg)	RS Jr	Baltimore, Maryland
G	24	Nicolas Fennell	6 ft 3 in (1.91 m)	160 lb (73 kg)	RS So	Bowie, Maryland
F	25	Xavier McCoy	6 ft 2 in (1.88 m)	215 lb (98 kg)	RS Jr	Warsaw, North Carolina

Head coach

- LeVelle Moton (North Carolina Central)

Assistant coach(es)

- Brian Graves (Catawba)
- Reggie Sharp (Auburn)
- Nigel Thomas (Langston)

Legend

- (C) Team captain
- (S) Suspended
- (I) Ineligible
- (W) Walk-on
- Injured
- Current redshirt

Roster
Last update: January 1, 2020

== Schedule and results ==
Date time, TV	Rank^{#}	Opponent^{#}	Result	Record	Site (attendance) city, state
Non-conference regular season
November 9, 2019*; 2:30 pm, ESPN3		at Stephen F. Austin	L 64–94	0–1	William R. Johnson Coliseum (3,167); Nacogdoches, TX
November 11, 2019*; 7:00 pm, NCCU Sports Network		USC Upstate; Global Sports Shootout	W 73–64	1–1	McDougald–McLendon Arena (973); Durham, NC
November 15, 2019*; 7:00 pm, ESPN3		at Akron; Global Sports Shootout	L 47–57	1–2	James A. Rhodes Arena (2,103); Akron, OH
November 17, 2019*; 5:00 pm, ACCN		at No. 4 Louisville; Global Sports Shootout	L 58–87	1–3	KFC Yum! Center (14,874); Louisville, KY
November 19, 2019*; 7:00 pm, ESPN+		at Youngstown State; Global Sports Shootout	L 60–66	1–4	Beeghly Center (1,564); Youngstown, OH
November 21, 2019*; 7:00 pm, NCCU Sports Network		Bluefield State	W 68–44	2–4	McDougald–McLendon Arena (633); Durham, NC
November 26, 2019*; 8:00 pm, ESPN+		at Southern Illinois	L 48–64	2–5	Banterra Center (3,620); Carbondale, IL
December 2, 2019*; 7:00 pm, ESPN+		at Wofford	L 59–77	2–6	Jerry Richardson Indoor Stadium (1,241); Spartanburg, SC
December 4, 2019*; 7:00 pm, SECN+		at Georgia	L 59–95	2–7	Stegeman Coliseum (7,738); Athens, GA
December 7, 2019*; 5:30 pm, ESPN+		at Charleston Southern	L 53–58	2–8	CSU Field House (622); North Charleston, SC
December 11, 2019*; 7:00 pm, NCCU Sports Network		Christendom	W 109–28	3–8	McDougald–McLendon Arena (212); Durham, NC
December 14, 2019*; 2:00 pm, ESPN+		at Coastal Carolina	L 71–91	3–9	HTC Center (987); Conway, SC
December 17, 2019*; 7:30 pm, CUSA.TV		at Louisiana Tech	L 60–69	3–10	Thomas Assembly Center (2,156); Ruston, LA
December 30, 2019*; 7:00 pm, NCCU Sports Network		Mid-Atlantic Christian	W 108–63	4–10	McDougald–McLendon Arena (478); Durham, NC
MEAC regular season
January 4, 2020; 4:00 pm, NCCU Sports Network		Florida A&M	W 61–45	5–10 (1–0)	McDougald–McLendon Arena (988); Durham, NC
January 11, 2020; 2:00 pm		at Delaware State	L 66–68	5–11 (1–1)	Memorial Hall (519); Dover, DE
January 13, 2020; 7:30 pm		at Maryland Eastern Shore	W 69–64 ^{OT}	6–11 (2–1)	Hytche Athletic Center (555); Princess Anne, MD
January 18, 2020; 4:00 pm		at Bethune–Cookman	W 86–59	7–11 (3–1)	Moore Gymnasium (855); Daytona Beach, FL
January 20, 2020; 4:45 pm		at Florida A&M	L 57–66	7–12 (3–2)	Teaching Gym (407); Tallahassee, FL
January 25, 2020; 4:20 pm, NCCU Sports Network		Delaware State	W 72–45	8–12 (4–2)	McDougald–McLendon Arena (831); Durham, NC
February 1, 2020; 4:00 pm, NCCU Sports Network		South Carolina State	W 73–56	9–12 (5–2)	McDougald–McLendon Arena (1,229); Durham, NC
February 3, 2020; 7:00 pm, ESPNU		Norfolk State	W 69–63	10–12 (6–2)	McDougald–McLendon Arena (1,486); Durham, NC
February 8, 2020; 4:00 pm		at Coppin State	W 68–63	11–12 (7–2)	Physical Education Complex (942); Baltimore, MD
February 10, 2020; 4:00 pm		at Morgan State	W 58–57	12–12 (8–2)	Talmadge L. Hill Field House (2,108); Baltimore, MD
February 17, 2020; 7:00 pm, ESPNU		at North Carolina A&T	L 60–77	12–13 (8–3)	Corbett Sports Center (5,700); Greensboro, NC
February 22, 2020; 4:00 pm, NCCU Sports Network		Maryland Eastern Shore	W 74–55	13–13 (9–3)	McDougald–McLendon Arena (1,287); Durham, NC
February 24, 2020; 7:30 pm, NCCU Sports Network		Howard	W 80–65	14–13 (10–3)	McDougald–McLendon Arena (1,496); Durham, NC
February 29, 2020; 4:00 pm		at South Carolina State	W 83–82 ^{2OT}	15–13 (11–3)	SHM Memorial Center (477); Orangeburg, SC
March 2, 2020; 7:30 pm, NCCU Sports Network		Bethune–Cookman	W 71–68 ^{OT}	16–13 (12–3)	McDougald–McLendon Arena (1,338); Durham, NC
March 5, 2020; 7:00 pm, ESPNU		North Carolina A&T	W 86–80	17–13 (13–3)	McDougald–McLendon Arena (3,026); Durham, NC
MEAC tournament
March 11, 2020; 6:00 pm, FloSports	(1)	vs. (8) Delaware State; Quarterfinals	W 92–75	18–13	Norfolk Scope; Norfolk, VA
March 13, 2020; 6:00 pm, FloSports	(1)	vs. (4/5) Bethune-Cookman/Morgan State; Semifinals	MEAC Tournament Canceled		Norfolk Scope; Norfolk, VA
*Non-conference game. ^{#}Rankings from AP Poll. (#) Tournament seedings in parentheses. All times are in Eastern.
