= 2019–20 Maryland Eastern Shore Hawks men's basketball team =

American college basketball season

2019–20 Maryland Eastern Shore Hawks men's basketball
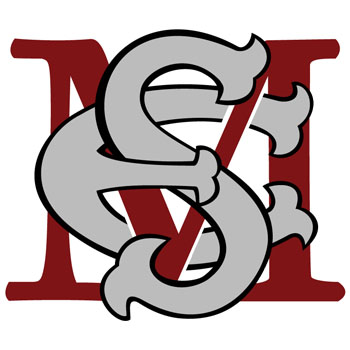
- Conference: Mid-Eastern Athletic Conference
- Record: 5–27 (4–12 MEAC)
- Head coach: Jason Crafton (1st season)
- Assistant coaches: Larry Stewart; Dominic Parker; Calvin Baker
- Home arena: Hytche Athletic Center

2019–20 MEAC men's basketball standings
	Conf.				Overall
Team	W		L	PCT	W		L	PCT
North Carolina Central	13	–	3	.813	18	–	13	.581
North Carolina A&T	12	–	4	.750	16	–	15	.516
Norfolk State	12	–	4	.750	16	–	15	.516
Florida A&M*	10	–	6	.625	12	–	15	.444
Bethune–Cookman	10	–	6	.625	16	–	14	.533
Morgan State	9	–	7	.563	15	–	16	.484
Coppin State	7	–	9	.438	11	–	20	.355
South Carolina State	6	–	10	.375	11	–	18	.379
MD Eastern Shore	4	–	12	.250	5	–	27	.156
Delaware State	4	–	12	.250	6	–	26	.188
Howard	1	–	15	.063	4	–	29	.121
* Ineligible for postseason due to improper certification of student-athletes Note: The 2020 MEAC tournament was canceled during the quarterfinals due to the COVID-19 pandemic.

The 2019–20 Maryland Eastern Shore Hawks men's basketball team represented the University of Maryland Eastern Shore in the 2019–20 NCAA Division I men's basketball season. The Hawks, led by first-year head coach Jason Crafton, played their home games at the Hytche Athletic Center in Princess Anne, Maryland as members of the Mid-Eastern Athletic Conference. They finished the season 5–27, 4–12 in MEAC play to finish in a tie for ninth place. They lost in the first round of the MEAC tournament to Delaware State.

== Previous season ==
The Hawks finished the 2018–19 season 7–25 overall, 5–11 in MEAC play, finishing in a tie for 9th place. In the MEAC tournament, they lost to South Carolina State in the first round.

On April 24, 2019, it was announced that Jason Crafton, assistant coach of the Delaware Blue Coats, the NBA G League affiliate of the Philadelphia 76ers, would be named head coach, meaning that the team would not retain interim head coach Clifford Reed.

== Roster ==
2019–20 Maryland Eastern Shore Hawks men's basketball team
Players
Coaches

Pos.	#	Name	Height	Weight	Year	Hometown
F	0	AJ Cheeseman	6 ft 7 in (2.01 m)	215 lb (98 kg)	Sr	Snellville, Georgia
F	1	Marlon Adams	6 ft 6 in (1.98 m)	220 lb (100 kg)	RS Jr	Brooklyn, New York
G	2	Ty Gibson	6 ft 4 in (1.93 m)	196 lb (89 kg)	Jr	Brooklyn, New York
PG	3	Canaan Bartley	6 ft 1 in (1.85 m)	175 lb (79 kg)	Jr	Miami, Florida
G	4	Kevon Voyles	6 ft 3 in (1.91 m)	181 lb (82 kg)	Fr	Berlin, Maryland
G	5	Da'Shawn Phillip	6 ft 5 in (1.96 m)	172 lb (78 kg)	Fr	Baltimore, Maryland
G	10	Glen Anderson	5 ft 7 in (1.7 m)	166 lb (75 kg)	Fr	Harlem, New York
G	11	Ahmad Frost	6 ft 0 in (1.83 m)	185 lb (84 kg)	RS Sr	Cincinnati, Ohio
G/F	12	Jahmal Wright	6 ft 6 in (1.98 m)	183 lb (83 kg)	Jr	Toronto, Ontario, Canada
PG	13	Bryan Urrutia	6 ft 1 in (1.85 m)	206 lb (93 kg)	Sr	Chihuahua, Mexico
G/F	14	Bruce Guy	6 ft 6 in (1.98 m)	210 lb (95 kg)	Fr	Cordova, Tennessee
F	21	Jacob McIntosh	6 ft 8 in (2.03 m)	212 lb (96 kg)	Sr	Finksburg, Maryland
F	22	Gabriel Gyamfi	6 ft 6 in (1.98 m)	185 lb (84 kg)	Sr	Brampton, Ontario, Canada
F/C	24	Walter Prevost	6 ft 8 in (2.03 m)	235 lb (107 kg)	RS So	Houston, Texas
G	33	Derrick Green	6 ft 3 in (1.91 m)	200 lb (91 kg)	RS Jr	Baltimore, Maryland

Head coach

- Jason Crafton (Nyack)

Assistant coach(es)

- Larry Stewart (Coppin State)
- Dominic Parker (Virginia State)
- Calvin Baker (Virginia)

Legend

- (C) Team captain
- (S) Suspended
- (I) Ineligible
- (W) Walk-on
- Injured
- Current redshirt

Roster
Last update: January 3, 2020

== Schedule and results ==
Date time, TV	Rank^{#}	Opponent^{#}	Result	Record	Site (attendance) city, state
Exhibition
October 30, 2019*; 8:00 pm		Salisbury	L 59–62		Hytche Athletic Center (1,564); Princess Anne, MD
Non-conference regular season
November 5, 2019*; 7:00 pm		at Penn State	L 46–84	0–1	Bryce Jordan Center (5,869); University Park, PA
November 10, 2019*; 2:00 pm, ESPN+		at Liberty	L 55–66	0–2	Vines Center (3,090); Lynchburg, VA
November 12, 2019*; 7:00 pm, ESPN+		at Longwood	L 55–85	0–3	Willett Hall (1,225); Farmville, VA
November 16, 2019*; 6:00 pm, ESPN+		at Morehead State; NABC Hall of Fame Classic campus-site game	L 53–76	0–4	Ellis Johnson Arena (1,645); Morehead, KY
November 19, 2019*; 10:00 pm		at Stanford; NABC Hall of Fame Classic campus-site game	L 55–76	0–5	Maples Pavilion (2,173); Stanford, CA
November 21, 2019*; 8:00 pm		at Oklahoma; NABC Hall of Fame Classic campus-site game	L 64–91	0–6	Lloyd Noble Center (6,040); Norman, OK
November 26, 2019*; 6:00 pm		Wofford; NABC Hall of Fame Classic campus-site game	L 42–67	0–7	Hytche Athletic Center (300); Princess Anne, MD
November 29, 2019*; 7:00 pm		at Delaware	L 56–75	0–8	Bob Carpenter Center (1,816); Newark, DE
December 1, 2019*; 2:00 pm, ESPN+		at Fordham	L 45–66	0–9	Rose Hill Gymnasium (1,482); Bronx, NY
December 3, 2019*; 7:30 pm, ESPN+		at No. 18 Baylor	L 46–78	0–10	Ferrell Center (6,195); Waco, TX
December 8, 2019*; 4:00 pm		Clarks Summit	W 85–39	1–10	Hytche Athletic Center (300); Princess Anne, MD
December 17, 2019*; 7:00 pm		at East Carolina	L 57–71	1–11	Williams Arena (2,584); Greenville, NC
December 19, 2019*; 7:00 pm		at Charlotte	L 44–66	1–12	Dale F. Halton Arena (2,580); Charlotte, NC
December 22, 2019*; 2:00 pm		at Old Dominion	L 52–76	1–13	Chartway Arena (5,376); Norfolk, VA
December 29, 2019*; 6:00 pm, ACCNX		at Virginia Tech	L 37–92	1–14	Cassell Coliseum (7,642); Blacksburg, VA
MEAC regular season
January 4, 2020; 4:00 pm		Howard	W 78–66	2–14 (1–0)	Hytche Athletic Center (555); Princess Anne, MD
January 11, 2020; 4:30 pm		North Carolina A&T	L 53–91	2–15 (1–1)	Hytche Athletic Center (555); Princess Anne, MD
January 13, 2020; 7:30 pm		North Carolina Central	L 64–69 ^{OT}	2–16 (1–2)	Hytche Athletic Center (555); Princess Anne, MD
January 18, 2020; 6:30 pm		at Norfolk State	L 52–62	2–17 (1–3)	Joseph G. Echols Memorial Hall (1,848); Norfolk, VA
January 20, 2020; 7:30 pm		at South Carolina State	L 53–68	2–18 (1–4)	SHM Memorial Center; Orangeburg, SC
January 27, 2020; 7:30 pm		Morgan State	L 50–56	2–19 (1–5)	Hytche Athletic Center (605); Princess Anne, MD
February 3, 2020; 7:30 pm		at Delaware State	W 68–66	3–19 (2–5)	Memorial Hall (947); Dover, DE
February 8, 2020; 4:00 pm		at Morgan State	L 53–61	3–20 (2–6)	Talmadge L. Hill Field House (l); Baltimore, MD
February 10, 2020; 7:30 pm		at Coppin State	L 67–68 ^{OT}	3–21 (2–7)	Physical Education Complex (717); Baltimore, MD
February 15, 2020; 4:00 pm		Bethune–Cookman	W 66–58	4–21 (3–7)	Hytche Athletic Center (600); Princess Anne, MD
February 17, 2020; 7:30 pm		Florida A&M	W 81–71	5–21 (4–7)	Hytche Athletic Center (660); Princess Anne, MD
February 22, 2020; 4:00 pm		at North Carolina Central	L 55–74	5–22 (4–8)	McDougald–McLendon Arena (1,287); Durham, NC
February 24, 2020; 7:30 pm		at North Carolina A&T	L 62–83	5–23 (4–9)	Corbett Sports Center (2,853); Greensboro, NC
February 29, 2020; 4:00 pm		Delaware State	L 63–84	5–24 (4–10)	Hytche Athletic Center (2,043); Princess Anne, MD
March 2, 2020; 7:30 pm		at Howard	L 60–62	5–25 (4–11)	Burr Gymnasium (1,287); Washington, D.C.
March 5, 2020; 7:30 pm		Coppin State	L 60–63	5–26 (4–12)	Hytche Athletic Center (550); Princess Anne, MD
MEAC tournament
March 10, 2020; 6:00 pm, FloSports	(9)	vs. (8) Delaware State; First round	L 64–68	5–27	Norfolk Scope; Norfolk, VA
*Non-conference game. ^{#}Rankings from AP Poll. (#) Tournament seedings in parentheses. All times are in Eastern.
