= 2019–20 Norfolk State Spartans men's basketball team =

American college basketball season

2019–20 Norfolk State Spartans men's basketball
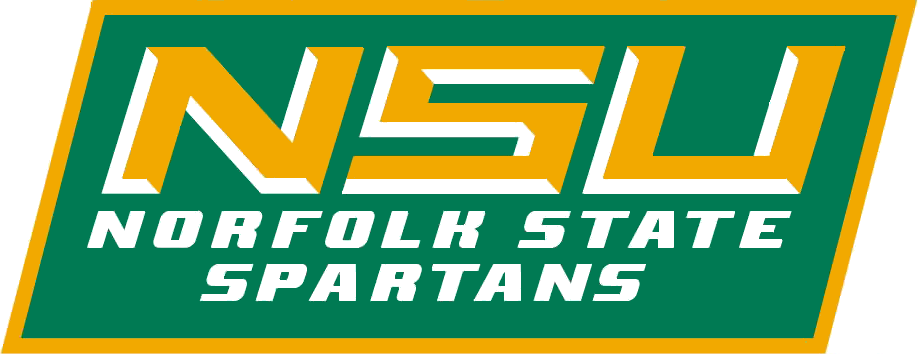
- Conference: Mid-Eastern Athletic Conference
- Record: 16–15 (12–4 MEAC)
- Head coach: Robert Jones (7th season)
- Assistant coaches: Jamal Brown; C.J. Clemons; Leonard Fairley
- Home arena: Joseph G. Echols Memorial Hall

2019–20 MEAC men's basketball standings
	Conf.				Overall
Team	W		L	PCT	W		L	PCT
North Carolina Central	13	–	3	.813	18	–	13	.581
North Carolina A&T	12	–	4	.750	16	–	15	.516
Norfolk State	12	–	4	.750	16	–	15	.516
Florida A&M*	10	–	6	.625	12	–	15	.444
Bethune–Cookman	10	–	6	.625	16	–	14	.533
Morgan State	9	–	7	.563	15	–	16	.484
Coppin State	7	–	9	.438	11	–	20	.355
South Carolina State	6	–	10	.375	11	–	18	.379
MD Eastern Shore	4	–	12	.250	5	–	27	.156
Delaware State	4	–	12	.250	6	–	26	.188
Howard	1	–	15	.063	4	–	29	.121
* Ineligible for postseason due to improper certification of student-athletes Note: The 2020 MEAC tournament was canceled during the quarterfinals due to the COVID-19 pandemic.

The 2019–20 Norfolk State Spartans men's basketball team represent Norfolk State University during the 2019–20 NCAA Division I men's basketball season. The Spartans, led by seventh-year coach Robert Jones, play their home games at the Joseph G. Echols Memorial Hall in Norfolk, Virginia as members of the Mid-Eastern Athletic Conference.

== Previous season ==
The Spartans finished the season 22–14 overall, 14–2 in MEAC play to finish in first place, and win the MEAC regular season championship. As the No. 1 seed in the MEAC tournament, they were upset in the championship game by No. 3 seed North Carolina Central. As a conference champion who failed to win their conference tournament, and not selected to participate in the NCAA tournament, they were awarded an automatic bid to the NIT. Given a No. 8 seed in the Alabama bracket, they upset No. 1 seed Alabama in the first round, then were defeated in the second round by No. 4 seed Colorado.

== Roster ==
2019–20 Norfolk State Spartans men's basketball team
Players
Coaches

Pos.	#	Name	Height	Weight	Year	Hometown
G	0	Jared White	6 ft 7 in (2.01 m)	220 lb (100 kg)	Fr	Bowie, MD
F	1	Nyzaiah Chambers	6 ft 7 in (2.01 m)	225 lb (102 kg)	Fr	Chesapeake, VA
G/F	2	Kashaun Hicks	6 ft 6 in (1.98 m)	225 lb (102 kg)	RS Jr	Harlem, NY
G	3	Caleb Dawkins	6 ft 1 in (1.85 m)	150 lb (68 kg)	Fr	Chesapeake, VA
G	4	Joe Bryant Jr.	6 ft 1 in (1.85 m)	215 lb (98 kg)	So	Norfolk, VA
G/F	5	Tyrese Jenkins	6 ft 6 in (1.98 m)	205 lb (93 kg)	Fr	Richmond, VA
G	11	Jermaine Bishop	6 ft 1 in (1.85 m)	185 lb (84 kg)	RS Sr	Queens, NY
G	13	Daryl Anderson	6 ft 6 in (1.98 m)	185 lb (84 kg)	Fr	Chesterfield, VA
G	14	Devante Carter	6 ft 3 in (1.91 m)	200 lb (91 kg)	Jr	Newport News, VA
G/F	22	Spirit Ricks	6 ft 8 in (2.03 m)	215 lb (98 kg)	Jr	Patterson, CA
C	23	Efstratios Kalogerias	6 ft 10 in (2.08 m)	230 lb (104 kg)	Jr	Piraeus, Greece
F	32	Chris Ford	6 ft 8 in (2.03 m)	220 lb (100 kg)	So	Chesterfield, VA
G	34	Steven Whitley	6 ft 3 in (1.91 m)	215 lb (98 kg)	RS Sr	Norfolk, VA
G/F	35	Yoro Sidibe	6 ft 7 in (2.01 m)	220 lb (100 kg)	Fr	Dakar, Senegal
G	55	Kyonze Chavis	6 ft 4 in (1.93 m)	185 lb (84 kg)	RS Jr	Chesapeake, VA

Head coach

- Robert Jones (SUNY New Paltz)

Assistant coach(es)

- Jamal Brown (South Carolina State)
- C.J. Clemons (Norfolk State)
- Leonard Fairley (Norfolk State)

Legend

- (C) Team captain
- (S) Suspended
- (I) Ineligible
- (W) Walk-on
- Injured
- Current redshirt

Roster
Last update: September 27, 2019

== Schedule and results ==
Date time, TV	Rank^{#}	Opponent^{#}	Result	Record	Site city, state
Non-conference regular season
November 5, 2019*; 8:00 pm		Greensboro College	W 100–59	1–0	Joseph G. Echols Memorial Hall (1,706); Norfolk, VA
November 8, 2019*; 7:00 pm		Penn State Wilkes-Barre	W 93–53	2–0	Joseph G. Echols Memorial Hall (1,029); Norfolk, VA
November 12, 2019*; 7:30 pm, SECN+		at Ole Miss	L 55–68	2–1	The Pavilion at Ole Miss (6,412); Oxford, MS
November 14, 2019*; 8:00 pm		The Apprentice	W 113–54	3–1	Joseph G. Echols Memorial Hall (1,034); Norfolk, VA
November 19, 2019*; 7:00 pm, ESPN+		at Bradley	L 57–69	3–2	Carver Arena (4,813); Peoria, IL
November 22, 2019*; 8:00 pm, BTN+		at Northwestern	L 59–70	3–3	Welsh–Ryan Arena (4,954); Evanston, IL
November 26, 2019*; 5:00 pm, ESPN+		vs. Caldwell	L 54–64	3–4	OceanFirst Bank Center (101); West Long Branch, NJ
November 27, 2019*; 7:00 pm, ESPN+		at Monmouth	L 71–75	3–5	OceanFirst Bank Center (1,369); West Long Branch, NJ
December 1, 2019*; 4:00 pm		Niagara	L 61–65	3–6	Joseph G. Echols Memorial Hall (824); Norfolk, VA
December 4, 2019*; 8:00 pm, ESPN+		at Southern Illinois	L 59–76	3–7	Banterra Center (3,761); Carbondale, IL
December 7, 2019*; 6:00 pm, ESPN+		at Hampton	L 53–64	3–8	Hampton Convocation Center (7,123); Hampton, VA
December 15, 2019*; 2:00 pm, ESPN3		at Loyola–Chicago	L 45–64	3–9	Joseph J. Gentile Arena (2,428); Chicago, IL
December 20, 2019*; 7:00 pm		vs. Bowling Green; Boardwalk Battle	W 72–67 ^{OT}	4–9	Boardwalk Hall (500); Atlantic City, NJ
December 21, 2019*; 4:30 pm		vs. Drexel; Boardwalk Battle	L 49–53	4–10	Boardwalk Hall (500); Atlantic City, NJ
December 29, 2019*; 12:00 pm, ESPN3		at Stony Brook	L 65–81	4–11	Island Federal Credit Union Arena (2,488); Stony Brook, NY
MEAC regular season
January 4, 2020; 6:30 pm		Bethune–Cookman	W 85–72	5–11 (1–0)	Joseph G. Echols Memorial Hall (918); Norfolk, VA
January 6, 2020; 7:30 pm		at Coppin State	W 82–59	6–11 (2–0)	Physical Education Complex (619); Baltimore, MD
January 11, 2020; 4:20 pm		at Howard	W 71–63	7–11 (3–0)	Burr Gymnasium (1,107); Washington, D.C.
January 18, 2020; 6:30 pm		Maryland Eastern Shore	W 62–52	8–11 (4–0)	Joseph G. Echols Memorial Hall (1,848); Norfolk, VA
January 25, 2020; 6:30 pm		South Carolina State	W 73–62	9–11 (5–0)	Joseph G. Echols Memorial Hall (2,374); Norfolk, VA
January 27, 2020; 8:00 pm, ESPNU		Florida A&M	W 95–67	10–11 (6–0)	Joseph G. Echols Memorial Hall (3,016); Norfolk, VA
February 1, 2020; 4:00 pm		at North Carolina A&T	L 68–74	10–12 (6–1)	Corbett Sports Center (4,317); Greensboro, NC
February 3, 2020; 7:00 pm, ESPNU		at North Carolina Central	L 63–69	10–13 (6–2)	McDougald–McLendon Arena (1,486); Durham, NC
February 8, 2020; 6:30 pm		Delaware State	W 85–57	11–13 (7–2)	Joseph G. Echols Memorial Hall (2,319); Norfolk, VA
February 15, 2020; 6:30 pm		Morgan State	W 62–57	12–13 (8–2)	Joseph G. Echols Memorial Hall (2,908); Norfolk, VA
February 17, 2020; 8:00 pm		Coppin State	W 80–60	13–13 (9–2)	Joseph G. Echols Memorial Hall (2,668); Norfolk, VA
February 22, 2020; 4:00 pm		at Florida A&M	L 63–66	13–14 (9–3)	Teaching Gym (1,717); Tallahassee, FL
February 24, 2020; 7:30 pm		at Bethune–Cookman	L 55–78	13–15 (9–4)	Moore Gymnasium (805); Daytona Beach, FL
February 29, 2020; 6:30 pm		Howard	W 89–59	14–15 (10–4)	Joseph G. Echols Memorial Hall (4,127); Norfolk, VA
March 2, 2020; 7:30 pm		at Delaware State	W 79–73	15–15 (11–4)	Memorial Hall (1,511); Dover, DE
March 5, 2020; 7:30		at Morgan State	W 68–62	16–15 (12–4)	Talmadge L. Hill Field House (1,198); Baltimore, MD
MEAC tournament
March 12, 2020; 8:00 pm, FloSports	(3)	vs. (6) Coppin State; Quarterfinals	MEAC Tournament Canceled		Norfolk Scope; Norfolk, VA
*Non-conference game. ^{#}Rankings from AP Poll. (#) Tournament seedings in parentheses. All times are in Eastern Time.

Schedule source:
