= 2019–20 Delaware State Hornets men's basketball team =

American college basketball season

2019–20 Delaware State Hornets men's basketball
- Conference: Mid-Eastern Athletic Conference
- Record: 6–26 (4–12 MEAC)
- Head coach: Eric Skeeters (2nd season)
- Assistant coaches: Keith Goodie; Kevin McClain; Stephen Stewart
- Home arena: Memorial Hall

2019–20 MEAC men's basketball standings
	Conf.				Overall
Team	W		L	PCT	W		L	PCT
North Carolina Central	13	–	3	.813	18	–	13	.581
North Carolina A&T	12	–	4	.750	16	–	15	.516
Norfolk State	12	–	4	.750	16	–	15	.516
Florida A&M*	10	–	6	.625	12	–	15	.444
Bethune–Cookman	10	–	6	.625	16	–	14	.533
Morgan State	9	–	7	.563	15	–	16	.484
Coppin State	7	–	9	.438	11	–	20	.355
South Carolina State	6	–	10	.375	11	–	18	.379
MD Eastern Shore	4	–	12	.250	5	–	27	.156
Delaware State	4	–	12	.250	6	–	26	.188
Howard	1	–	15	.063	4	–	29	.121
* Ineligible for postseason due to improper certification of student-athletes Note: The 2020 MEAC tournament was canceled during the quarterfinals due to the COVID-19 pandemic.

The 2019–20 Delaware State Hornets men's basketball team represented Delaware State University in the 2019–20 NCAA Division I men's basketball season. The Hornets, led by second-year head coach Eric Skeeters, played their home games at Memorial Hall in Dover, Delaware as members of the Mid-Eastern Athletic Conference. They finished the season 6–26, 4–12 in MEAC play to finish in a tie for ninth place. As the No. 8 seed in the MEAC tournament, they beat Maryland Eastern Shore in the first round before losing to North Carolina Central.

== Previous season ==
The Hornets finished the 2018–19 season 6–25, 2–14 in MEAC play to finish in last place. In the MEAC tournament, they upset Savannah State in the first round, before falling to North Carolina Central in the quarterfinals.

== Roster ==
2019–20 Delaware State Hornets men's basketball team
Players
Coaches

Pos.	#	Name	Height	Weight	Year	Hometown
G	0	Leroy Moore	5 ft 11 in (1.8 m)	160 lb (73 kg)	So	Philadelphia, Pennsylvania
F	1	D'Marco Baucum	6 ft 6 in (1.98 m)	225 lb (102 kg)	So	Washington, D.C.
G/F	2	Omari Peek-Green	6 ft 6 in (1.98 m)	210 lb (95 kg)	Fr	Fairfield, Ohio
G/F	3	Lance Singh III	6 ft 5 in (1.96 m)	175 lb (79 kg)	Jr	Mount Pocono, Pennsylvania
PG	4	Johquin "Pinky" Wiley	5 ft 11 in (1.8 m)	175 lb (79 kg)	Jr	Chesterfield, Virginia
G	5	John Stansbury	6 ft 3 in (1.91 m)	195 lb (88 kg)	So	New Castle, Delaware
F	10	Ronald Lucas	6 ft 6 in (1.98 m)	190 lb (86 kg)	So	Baltimore, Maryland
F/C	13	Fahim Jenneto	6 ft 7 in (2.01 m)	230 lb (104 kg)	So	Ajax, Ontario, Canada
F	15	Ameer Bennett	6 ft 8 in (2.03 m)	220 lb (100 kg)	Jr	Richmond, Virginia
C	21	Chris Yannick	7 ft 3 in (2.21 m)	230 lb (104 kg)	So	Washington, D.C.
G	22	Joseph White II	5 ft 11 in (1.8 m)	145 lb (66 kg)	Jr	Baltimore, Maryland
G	23	Jordan Bushrod	6 ft 4 in (1.93 m)	190 lb (86 kg)	Sr	Fort Washington, Maryland
G	24	John Crosby	6 ft 3 in (1.91 m)	200 lb (91 kg)	Sr	Baltimore, Maryland
G	32	Myles Carter	6 ft 1 in (1.85 m)	170 lb (77 kg)	Jr	Philadelphia, Pennsylvania

Head coach

- Eric Skeeters (Coppin State)

Assistant coach(es)

- Keith Goodie (Morgan State)
- Kevin McClain (America)
- Stephen Stewart (Coppin State)

Legend

- (C) Team captain
- (S) Suspended
- (I) Ineligible
- (W) Walk-on
- Injured
- Current redshirt

Roster
Last update: January 2, 2020

== Schedule and results ==
Date time, TV	Rank^{#}	Opponent^{#}	Result	Record	Site (attendance) city, state
Non-conference regular season
November 8, 2019*; 7:00 pm		Rider	L 54–81	0–1	Memorial Hall (1,108); Dover, DE
November 12, 2019*; 7:00 pm, ESPN+		at Manhattan	L 74–85	0–2	Draddy Gymnasium (920); Bronx, NY
November 15, 2019*; 7:00 pm, SECN+		at Georgia; Maui on the Mainland	L 66–100	0–3	Stegeman Coliseum (8,167); Athens, GA
November 18, 2019*; 7:00 pm		LIU	L 84–92	0–4	Memorial Hall (840); Dover, DE
November 20, 2019*; 7:00 pm, ACCNX		at Virginia Tech	L 64–100	0–5	Cassell Coliseum (8,421); Blacksburg, VA
November 23, 2019*; 2:00 pm, ESPN3		at East Tennessee State; Maui on the Mainland	L 66–98	0–6	Freedom Hall Civic Center (4,004); Johnson City, TN
November 24, 2019*; 11:30 am		vs. Charleston Southern; Maui on the Mainland	L 61–71	0–7	Freedom Hall Civic Center (2,509); Johnson City, TN
November 26, 2019*; 7:00 pm		Saint Elizabeth	W 90–53	1–7	Memorial Hall (245); Dover, DE
November 30, 2019*; 6:00 pm		Coastal Carolina	L 77–92	1–8	Memorial Hall (191); Dover, DE
December 4, 2019*; 7:00 pm		Loyola (MD)	L 76–84	1–9	Memorial Hall (813); Dover, DE
December 16, 2019*; 7:00 pm		vs. Delaware; Route 1 Rivalry	L 78–86	1–10	76ers Fieldhouse (1,936); Wilmington, DE
December 18, 2019*; 8:30 pm, ESPN+		at Jacksonville State	L 80–92	1–11	Pete Mathews Coliseum (1,674); Jacksonville, AL
December 22, 2019*; 2:00 pm		at St. Francis Brooklyn	L 62–81	1–12	Generoso Pope Athletic Complex (513); Brooklyn, NY
December 30, 2019*; 6:30 pm		Washington Adventist	L 76–78	1–13	Memorial Hall (249); Dover, DE
MEAC regular season
January 4, 2020; 2:00 pm		Morgan State	L 68–81	1–14 (0–1)	Memorial Hall (478); Dover, DE
January 11, 2020; 2:00 pm		North Carolina Central	W 68–66	2–14 (1–1)	Memorial Hall (519); Dover, DE
January 13, 2020; 7:30 pm		North Carolina A&T	L 77–98	2–15 (1–2)	Memorial Hall (872); Dover, DE
January 25, 2020; 4:20 pm		at North Carolina Central	L 45–72	2–16 (1–3)	McDougald–McLendon Arena (831); Durham, NC
January 27, 2020; 7:30 pm		at North Carolina A&T	L 67–82	2–17 (1–4)	Corbett Sports Center (3,567); Greensboro, NC
February 1, 2020; 2:00 pm		Coppin State	W 77–68	3–17 (2–4)	Memorial Hall (988); Dover, DE
February 3, 2020; 7:30 pm		Maryland Eastern Shore	L 66–68	3–18 (2–5)	Memorial Hall (947); Dover, DE
February 8, 2020; 6:30 pm		at Norfolk State	L 57–85	3–19 (2–6)	Joseph G. Echols Memorial Hall (2,319); Norfolk, VA
February 10, 2020; 4:00 pm		at South Carolina State	L 86–100	3–20 (2–7)	SHM Memorial Center; Orangeburg, SC
February 15, 2020; 2:00 pm		Florida A&M	L 95–97 ^{2OT}	3–21 (2–8)	Memorial Hall (571); Dover, DE
February 17, 2020; 7:30 pm		Bethune–Cookman	L 70–71	3–22 (2–9)	Memorial Hall (958); Dover, DE
February 22, 2020; 4:00 pm		at Coppin State	L 86–98	3–23 (2–10)	Physical Education Complex (2,436); Baltimore, MD
February 24, 2020; 7:30 pm		at Morgan State	L 80–90	3–24 (2–11)	Talmadge L. Hill Field House (1,167); Baltimore, MD
February 29, 2020; 4:00 pm		at Maryland Eastern Shore	W 84–63	4–24 (3–11)	Hytche Athletic Center (2,043); Princess Anne, MD
March 2, 2020; 7:30 pm		Norfolk State	L 73–79	4–25 (3–12)	Memorial Hall (1,511); Dover, DE
March 5, 2020; 7:30 pm		at Howard	W 100–88	5–25 (4–12)	Burr Gymnasium (1,121); Washington, D.C.
MEAC tournament
March 10, 2020; 6:00 pm, FloSports	(8)	vs. (9) Maryland Eastern Shore; First round	W 68–64	6–25	Norfolk Scope; Norfolk, VA
March 11, 2020; 6:00 pm, FloSports	(8)	vs. (1) North Carolina Central; Quarterfinals	L 75–92	6–26	Norfolk Scope; Norfolk, VA
*Non-conference game. ^{#}Rankings from AP Poll. (#) Tournament seedings in parentheses. All times are in Eastern.
