= 2019–20 Morgan State Bears basketball team =

American college basketball season

2019–20 Morgan State Bears men's basketball
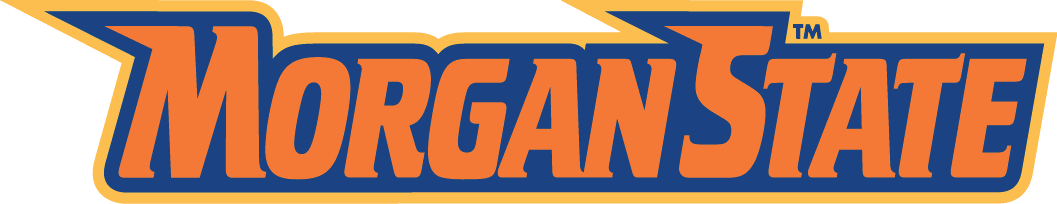
- Conference: Mid-Eastern Athletic Conference
- Record: 15–16 (9–7 MEAC)
- Head coach: Kevin Broadus (1st season)
- Assistant coaches: Brian Merritt; Chretien Lukusa; Kevin Jones
- Home arena: Talmadge L. Hill Field House

2019–20 MEAC men's basketball standings
	Conf.				Overall
Team	W		L	PCT	W		L	PCT
North Carolina Central	13	–	3	.813	18	–	13	.581
North Carolina A&T	12	–	4	.750	16	–	15	.516
Norfolk State	12	–	4	.750	16	–	15	.516
Florida A&M*	10	–	6	.625	12	–	15	.444
Bethune–Cookman	10	–	6	.625	16	–	14	.533
Morgan State	9	–	7	.563	15	–	16	.484
Coppin State	7	–	9	.438	11	–	20	.355
South Carolina State	6	–	10	.375	11	–	18	.379
MD Eastern Shore	4	–	12	.250	5	–	27	.156
Delaware State	4	–	12	.250	6	–	26	.188
Howard	1	–	15	.063	4	–	29	.121
* Ineligible for postseason due to improper certification of student-athletes Note: The 2020 MEAC tournament was canceled during the quarterfinals due to the COVID-19 pandemic.

The 2019–20 Morgan State Bears men's basketball team represent Morgan State University in the 2019–20 NCAA Division I men's basketball season. The Bears, led by 1st-year head coach Kevin Broadus, play their home games at Talmadge L. Hill Field House in Baltimore, Maryland as members of the Mid-Eastern Athletic Conference.

== Previous season ==
The Bears finished the 2018–19 season 9–21 overall, 4–12 in MEAC play, finishing in 11th place. In the MEAC tournament, they were defeated in the quarterfinals by Coppin State.

On March 19, 2019, it was announced that head coach Todd Bozeman's contract would not be renewed, ending his 13-year tenure with the team. On May 1, Kevin Broadus, an assistant head coach at Maryland, was announced as the team's next head coach.

== Roster ==
2019–20 Morgan State Bears men's basketball team
Players
Coaches

Pos.	#	Name	Height	Weight	Year	Hometown
G	0	Stanley Davis	6 ft 5 in (1.96 m)	204 lb (93 kg)	Sr	Chester, Pennsylvania
G	1	LaPri McCray-Pace	6 ft 4 in (1.93 m)	218 lb (99 kg)	Jr	Philadelphia, Pennsylvania
G	2	Isaiah Burke	6 ft 1 in (1.85 m)	180 lb (82 kg)	So	Bowie, Maryland
F	3	Victor Curry	6 ft 8 in (2.03 m)	215 lb (98 kg)	Sr	Chicago, Illinois
G	4	Kyson Rawls	6 ft 1 in (1.85 m)	200 lb (91 kg)	Jr	New Castle, Delaware
G	5	Sherwyn Devonish	6 ft 1 in (1.85 m)	192 lb (87 kg)	So	Bladensburg, Maryland
F	10	Victor Okafor	6 ft 8 in (2.03 m)	230 lb (104 kg)	Jr	Greenbelt, Maryland
G	11	Malik Miller	6 ft 4 in (1.93 m)	191 lb (87 kg)	So	Washington, D.C.
G	12	Thai're Vance	6 ft 2 in (1.88 m)	188 lb (85 kg)	Fr	Silver Spring, Maryland
F	13	Troy Baxter	6 ft 9 in (2.06 m)	200 lb (91 kg)	Jr	Tallahassee, Florida
G	14	Mohamed Camara	6 ft 5 in (1.96 m)	180 lb (82 kg)	Jr	Baltimore, Maryland
F	15	Lagio Grantsaan	6 ft 8 in (2.03 m)	235 lb (107 kg)	Jr	Utrecht, Netherlands
F	21	Peter Sorber	6 ft 8 in (2.03 m)	260 lb (118 kg)	Fr	Trenton, New Jersey
G	22	Cameron Shaw	6 ft 3 in (1.91 m)	185 lb (84 kg)	Fr	Baltimore, Maryland
F	24	Taron Oliver Jr.	6 ft 10 in (2.08 m)	287 lb (130 kg)	Sr	District Heights, Maryland
F	25	Troy Holston	6 ft 4 in (1.93 m)	197 lb (89 kg)	GS	Tampa, Florida
G	30	Ernest Jenkins	6 ft 2 in (1.88 m)	160 lb (73 kg)	RS Sr	Washington, D.C.
G	31	Elijah Bowens	5 ft 11 in (1.8 m)	160 lb (73 kg)	So	Bowie, Maryland
F	32	David Syfax Jr.	6 ft 7 in (2.01 m)	225 lb (102 kg)	Sr	Detroit, Michigan
F	33	Stephon Fisher	6 ft 9 in (2.06 m)	220 lb (100 kg)	Jr	Washington, D.C.
F	44	Jamar Brown	6 ft 9 in (2.06 m)	250 lb (113 kg)	Jr	Harlem, New York

Head coach

- Kevin Broadus (Bowie State)

Assistant coach(es)

- Brian Merritt (Towson)
- Chretien Lukusa (Binghamton)
- Kevin Jones (Bowie State)

Legend

- (C) Team captain
- (S) Suspended
- (I) Ineligible
- (W) Walk-on
- Injured
- Current redshirt

Roster
Last update: December 28, 2019

== Schedule and results ==
Date time, TV	Rank^{#}	Opponent^{#}	Result	Record	Site (attendance) city, state
Non-conference regular season
November 6, 2019*; 7:00 pm		Central Penn	W 71–44	1–0	Talmadge L. Hill Field House (1,826); Baltimore, MD
November 9, 2019*; 2:00 pm, ESPN3		at Temple	L 57–75	1–1	Liacouras Center (5,889); Philadelphia, PA
November 13, 2019*; 7:00 pm		Saint Francis (PA)	L 65–71	1–2	Talmadge L. Hill Field House (1,578); Baltimore, MD
November 16, 2019*; 1:00 pm, ESPN+		at George Washington	W 68–64	2–2	Charles E. Smith Center (2,725); Washington, D.C.
November 19, 2019*; 6:00 pm		Regent	W 88–52	3–2	Talmadge L. Hill Field House (750); Baltimore, MD
November 22, 2019*; 11:00 am, FloHoops		vs. Liberty; The Islands of the Bahamas Showcase quarterfinal	L 48–89	3–3	Baha Mar Convention Center (300); Nassau, Bahamas
November 23, 2019*; 11:00 am, FloHoops		vs. Milwaukee; The Islands of the Bahamas Showcase Consolation 2nd round	L 57–62	3–4	Baha Mar Convention Center; Nassau, Bahamas
November 24, 2019*; 11:00 am, FloHoops		vs. Evansville; The Islands of the Bahamas Showcase 7th place game	L 112–115 ^{3OT}	3–5	Baha Mar Convention Center (300); Nassau, Bahamas
November 29, 2019*; 9:00 pm, BTN/FSGO		at No. 10 Ohio State	L 57–90	3–6	Value City Arena (10,947); Columbus, OH
December 4, 2019*; 7:00 pm		Towson	L 59–76	3–7	Talmadge L. Hill Field House (3,789); Baltimore, MD
December 7, 2019*; 2:00 pm		Longwood	W 73–65	4–7	Talmadge L. Hill Field House (569); Baltimore, MD
December 14, 2019*; 2:00 pm, ESPN+		at La Salle	L 68–85	4–8	Tom Gola Arena (1,236); Philadelphia, PA
December 16, 2019*; 4:00 pm		Chestnut Hill	W 96–72	5–8	Talmadge L. Hill Field House (58); Baltimore, MD
December 28, 2019*; 10:00 pm		at Loyola Marymount	W 74–71	6–8	Gersten Pavilion (670); Los Angeles, CA
December 31, 2019*; 3:00 pm, Big West TV		at Cal State Northridge	L 82–93	6–9	Matadome (410); Northridge, CA
MEAC regular season
January 4, 2020; 2:00 pm		at Delaware State	W 81–68	7–9 (1–0)	Memorial Hall (478); Dover, DE
January 6, 2020; 7:30 pm		South Carolina State	W 77–63	8–9 (2–0)	Talmadge L. Hill Field House (872); Baltimore, MD
January 11, 2020; 3:30 pm		at Florida A&M	L 68–77	8–10 (2–1)	Teaching Gym (1,879); Tallahassee, FL
January 13, 2020; 7:30 pm		at Bethune–Cookman	L 78–85	8–11 (2–2)	Moore Gymnasium (903); Daytona Beach, FL
January 18, 2020; 4:00 pm		Howard	W 68–58	9–11 (3–2)	Talmadge L. Hill Field House (1,025); Baltimore, MD
January 20, 2020; 7:30 pm		North Carolina A&T	L 70–76	9–12 (3–3)	Talmadge L. Hill Field House (1,103); Baltimore, MD
January 25, 2020; 4:00 pm		at Coppin State	W 50–48	10–12 (4–3)	Physical Education Complex (1,011); Baltimore, MD
January 27, 2020; 7:30 pm		at Maryland Eastern Shore	W 56–50	11–12 (5–3)	Hytche Athletic Center (605); Princess Anne, MD
February 1, 2020; 4:00 pm		at Howard	W 89–83	12–12 (6–3)	Burr Gymnasium (1,327); Washington, D.C.
February 8, 2020; 4:00 pm		Maryland Eastern Shore	W 61–53	13–12 (7–3)	Talmadge L. Hill Field House (1,108); Baltimore, MD
February 10, 2020; 7:30 pm		North Carolina Central	L 57–58	13–13 (7–4)	Talmadge L. Hill Field House (2,108); Baltimore, MD
February 15, 2020; 6:30 pm		at Norfolk State	L 57–62	13–14 (7–5)	Joseph G. Echols Memorial Hall (2,908); Norfolk, VA
February 17, 2020; 7:30 pm		at South Carolina State	W 78–72	14–14 (8–5)	SHM Memorial Center (344); Orangeburg, SC
February 24, 2020; 7:30 pm		Delaware State	W 90–80	15–14 (9–5)	Talmadge L. Hill Field House (1,167); Baltimore, MD
February 29, 2020; 4:00 pm		Coppin State	L 65–72	15–15 (9–6)	Talmadge L. Hill Field House (3,212); Baltimore, MD
March 5, 2020; 7:30 pm		Norfolk State	L 62–68	15–16 (9–7)	Talmadge L. Hill Field House (1,198); Baltimore, MD
MEAC tournament
March 12, 2020; 6:00 pm, FloHoops	(5)	vs. (4) Bethune–Cookman; Quarterfinals	MEAC Tournament Canceled		Norfolk Scope; Norfolk, VA
*Non-conference game. ^{#}Rankings from AP Poll. (#) Tournament seedings in parentheses. All times are in Eastern.
