= 2019–20 Coppin State Eagles men's basketball team =

American college basketball season

2019–20 Coppin State Eagles men's basketball
- Conference: Mid-Eastern Athletic Conference
- Record: 11–20 (7–9 MEAC)
- Head coach: Juan Dixon (3rd season)
- Associate head coach: John Auslander
- Assistant coach: Charles Agumagu
- Home arena: Physical Education Complex

2019–20 MEAC men's basketball standings
	Conf.				Overall
Team	W		L	PCT	W		L	PCT
North Carolina Central	13	–	3	.813	18	–	13	.581
North Carolina A&T	12	–	4	.750	16	–	15	.516
Norfolk State	12	–	4	.750	16	–	15	.516
Florida A&M*	10	–	6	.625	12	–	15	.444
Bethune–Cookman	10	–	6	.625	16	–	14	.533
Morgan State	9	–	7	.563	15	–	16	.484
Coppin State	7	–	9	.438	11	–	20	.355
South Carolina State	6	–	10	.375	11	–	18	.379
MD Eastern Shore	4	–	12	.250	5	–	27	.156
Delaware State	4	–	12	.250	6	–	26	.188
Howard	1	–	15	.063	4	–	29	.121
* Ineligible for postseason due to improper certification of student-athletes Note: The 2020 MEAC tournament was canceled during the quarterfinals due to the COVID-19 pandemic.

The 2019–20 Coppin State Eagles men's basketball team represented Coppin State University in the 2019–20 NCAA Division I men's basketball season. The Eagles, led by third-year head coach Juan Dixon, played their home games at the Physical Education Complex in Baltimore, Maryland as members of the Mid-Eastern Athletic Conference (MEAC).

== Previous season ==
The Eagles finished the 2018–19 season 8–25 overall, 7–9 in MEAC play, finishing in 8th place. In the MEAC tournament, they defeated Morgan State in the first round, before falling to North Carolina A&T in the quarterfinals.

== Roster ==
2019–20 Coppin State Eagles men's basketball team
Players
Coaches

Pos.	#	Name	Height	Weight	Year	Hometown
G	0	Aaron Robinson	6 ft 6 in (1.98 m)	215 lb (98 kg)	GS	Takoma Park, MD
G	1	Ibn Williams	5 ft 11 in (1.8 m)	165 lb (75 kg)	So	Newark, NJ
G	2	Kamar McKnight	6 ft 4 in (1.93 m)	205 lb (93 kg)	RS Sr	Toronto, ON
F	3	Giir Ring	6 ft 8 in (2.03 m)	225 lb (102 kg)	So	Sydney, Australia
G/F	4	Nigel Marshall	6 ft 5 in (1.96 m)	220 lb (100 kg)	So	Irvington, NJ
G	5	Reggie James	6 ft 4 in (1.93 m)	195 lb (88 kg)	Fr	Trenton, NJ
G/F	10	Koby Thomas	6 ft 6 in (1.98 m)	190 lb (86 kg)	Jr	Philadelphia, PA
G	13	Dejuan Clayton	6 ft 2 in (1.88 m)	185 lb (84 kg)	RS Jr	Bowie, MD
G/F	14	Andrew Robinson	6 ft 7 in (2.01 m)	215 lb (98 kg)	GS	Takoma Park, MD
F	20	Jordan Hardwick	6 ft 7 in (2.01 m)	210 lb (95 kg)	Jr	Wethersfield, CT
F	22	Kenan Sarvan	6 ft 10 in (2.08 m)	225 lb (102 kg)	Fr	Heeze, Netherlands
G	25	Isaiah Gross	6 ft 4 in (1.93 m)	210 lb (95 kg)	Fr	Lanham, MD
C	35	Brendan Medley-Bacon	7 ft 1 in (2.16 m)	245 lb (111 kg)	So	Baltimore, MD

Head coach

- Juan Dixon (Maryland)

Assistant coach(es)

- John Auslander (Maryland)
- Charles Agumagu (Barry)

Legend

- (C) Team captain
- (S) Suspended
- (I) Ineligible
- (W) Walk-on
- Injured
- Current redshirt

Roster
Last update: October 21, 2024

== Schedule and results ==
Date time, TV	Rank^{#}	Opponent^{#}	Result	Record	Site (attendance) city, state
Non-conference regular season
November 5, 2019*; 7:00 p.m.		Rider	L 84–91	0–1	Physical Education Complex (815); Baltimore, MD
November 8, 2019*; 7:00 p.m., ACCNX		at Virginia Tech	L 42–74	0–2	Cassell Coliseum (9,275); Blacksburg, VA
November 12, 2019*; 8:00 p.m., NBCSC+		at Loyola–Chicago	W 76–72	1–2	Joseph J. Gentile Arena (2,491); Chicago, IL
November 15, 2019*; 7:00 p.m.		at Northern Illinois; Collegiate Hoops Roadshow	L 69–81	1–3	Convocation Center (695); DeKalb, IL
November 17, 2019*; 2:00 p.m., ESPN3		at Northern Kentucky; Collegiate Hoops Roadshow	L 70–82	1–4	BB&T Arena (2,807); Highland Heights, KY
November 19, 2019*; 10:00 p.m.		at Pacific; Collegiate Hoops Roadshow	L 60–64	1–5	Alex G. Spanos Center (1,309); Stockton, CA
November 23, 2019*; 7:00 p.m.		Cornell	W 68–66 ^{OT}	2–5	Physical Education Complex (762); Baltimore, MD
November 26, 2019*; 7:00 p.m.		at James Madison	W 94–78	3–5	JMU Convocation Center (2,089); Harrisonburg, VA
November 29, 2019*; 9:00 p.m.		at Montana; Collegiate Hoops Roadshow	L 62–69	3–6	Dahlberg Arena (3,335); Missoula, MT
December 3, 2019*; 7:00 p.m., ESPN3		at East Carolina	W 85–75	4–6	Williams Arena (3,208); Greenville, NC
December 10, 2019*; 7:00 p.m., ESPN+		at Davidson	L 52–88	4–7	John M. Belk Arena (3,029); Davidson, NC
December 15, 2019*; 1:30 p.m., ESPN+		at UMBC	L 77–86	4–8	UMBC Event Center (2,164); Catonsville, MD
December 21, 2019*; 2:00 p.m., ACCNX		at Miami (FL)	L 60–91	4–9	Watsco Center (4,963); Coral Gables, FL
December 27, 2019*; 7:00 p.m.		at Mount St. Mary's	L 55–79	4–10	Knott Arena (1,703); Emmitsburg, MD
December 30, 2019*; 7:00 p.m., ESPN+		at Fordham	L 56–62	4–11	Rose Hill Gymnasium (1,548); The Bronx, NY
MEAC regular season
January 4, 2020; 4:00 p.m.		South Carolina State	L 75–79	4–12 (0–1)	Physical Education Complex (672); Baltimore, MD
January 6, 2020; 7:30 p.m.		Norfolk State	L 59–82	4–13 (0–2)	Physical Education Complex (619); Baltimore, MD
January 11, 2020; 4:15 p.m.		at Bethune–Cookman	L 80–85	4–14 (0–3)	Moore Gymnasium (376); Daytona Beach, FL
January 13, 2020; 8:00 p.m.		at Florida A&M	L 54–65	4–15 (0–4)	Teaching Gym (473); Tallahassee, FL
January 18, 2020; 4:00 p.m.		North Carolina A&T	W 79–75	5–15 (1–4)	Physical Education Complex (551); Baltimore, MD
January 25, 2020; 4:30 p.m.		Morgan State	W 50–48	5–16 (1–5)	Physical Education Complex (1,011); Baltimore, MD
January 27, 2020; 7:30 p.m., FloHoops		Howard	W 82–75	6–16 (2–5)	Physical Education Complex (824); Baltimore, MD
February 1, 2020; 2:00 p.m.		at Delaware State	L 68–77	6–17 (2–6)	Memorial Hall (988); Dover, DE
February 3, 2020; 7:30 p.m.		at Howard	W 64–56	7–17 (3–6)	Burr Gymnasium (1,121); Washington, D.C.
February 8, 2020; 4:00 p.m., FloHoops		North Carolina Central	L 63–68	7–18 (3–7)	Physical Education Complex (942); Baltimore, MD
February 10, 2020; 7:30 p.m.		Maryland Eastern Shore	W 68–67 ^{OT}	8–18 (4–7)	Physical Education Complex (717); Baltimore, MD
February 15, 2020; 4:00 p.m.		at South Carolina State	L 66–70	8–19 (4–8)	SHM Memorial Center; Orangeburg, SC
February 17, 2020; 8:00 p.m.		at Norfolk State	L 60–80	8–20 (4–9)	Joseph G. Echols Memorial Hall (2,668); Norfolk, VA
February 22, 2020; 4:00 p.m.		Delaware State	W 98–86	9–20 (5–9)	Physical Education Complex (2,436); Baltimore, MD
February 29, 2020; 4:00 p.m., FloHoops		at Morgan State	W 72–65	10–20 (6–9)	Talmadge L. Hill Field House (2,312); Baltimore, MD
March 5, 2020; 7:30 p.m.		at Maryland Eastern Shore	W 63–60	11–20 (7–9)	Hytche Athletic Center (550); Princess Anne, MD
MEAC tournament
March 12, 2020; 8:00 p.m., FloHoops	(6)	vs. (3) Norfolk State; Quarterfinals	MEAC tournament canceled		Norfolk Scope; Norfolk, VA
*Non-conference game. ^{#}Rankings from AP poll. (#) Tournament seedings in parentheses. All times are in Eastern.
