= Jay Joyner =

American basketball player and coach

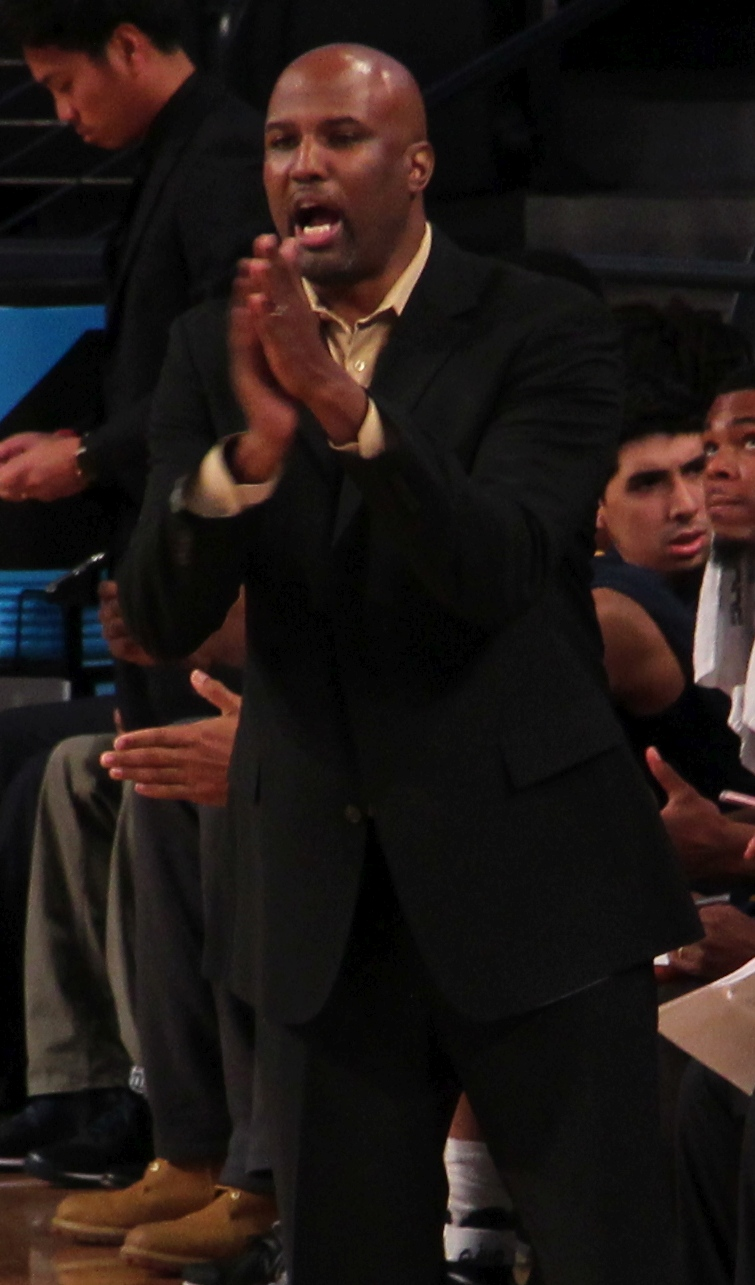
- Joyner in 2016

Biographical details
- Born: Amityville, New York, U.S.

Playing career
- 1993–1996: South Carolina State
- 199?–199?: CB 1939 Canarias

Coaching career (HC unless noted)
- 2002–2003: Centennial HS (assistant)
- 2003–2005: Tennessee State (assistant)
- 2005–2006: Columbia State CC (assistant)
- 2006–2008: Rutgers (assistant)
- 2008–2009: Cumberland (assistant)
- 2009–2012: Columbia State CC
- 2012–2016: North Carolina A&T (assistant)
- 2016–2020: North Carolina A&T

Head coaching record
- Overall: 47–62 (college)
- Tournaments: 0–1 (CIT)

Accomplishments and honors

Awards
- MEAC Coach of the Year (2018)

Jay Joyner is an American college basketball coach and former head coach for the North Carolina A&T Aggies men's basketball team. He is currently working at Molasky Junior High School as a physical education boys teacher in Las Vegas, Nevada. [1][2]

== Playing career ==
Joyner played college basketball at South Carolina State under Cy Alexander, and was a part of the Bulldogs 1996 NCAA tournament squad. After college he played for the CB 1939 Canarias in Spain's Liga ACB, but retired due to nagging knee problems and his first child on the way.

== Coaching career ==
Joyner's college coaching career began under Alexander at Tennessee State, where he served as an assistant coach. He'd then move on to assistant coaching jobs at Columbia State, Rutgers, and Cumberland before returning to Columbia State as head coach. In three seasons with the Chargers, he compiled a 61–23 record and two Tennessee Junior and Community College Athletic Association regular season titles.

When Alexander was named the head coach at North Carolina A&T, Joyner joined his staff as the associate head coach. He was elevated to the head coaching position on March 7, 2016 after Alexander resigned. In 2017–18, he led the Aggies to a 20–15 overall record and earned Mid-Eastern Athletic Conference (MEAC) Coach of the Year honors. The team posted consecutive winning seasons during his tenure. On December 27, 2019 NC A&T State University announced a change in leadership, and stated that the issue was a "personnel matter" and would not comment further. Joyner was replaced by associate head coach Willie Jones as head coach.

== Head coaching record ==
=== College ===
Record table
Season	Team	Overall	Conference	Standing	Postseason
North Carolina A&T Aggies (Mid-Eastern Athletic Conference) (2016–2019)
2015–16	North Carolina A&T	5–5^{‡}	5–3^{‡}	T–6th	
2016–17	North Carolina A&T	3–29	1–15	13th	
2017–18	North Carolina A&T	20–15	11–5	T–4th	CIT First Round
2018–19	North Carolina A&T	19–13	13–3	2nd	
2019–20	North Carolina A&T	10–12	6–1		
North Carolina A&T:		57–74 (.435)	36–27 (.571)	‡ Cy Alexander resigned January 29, 2016; Joyner coached rest of season.	
Total:		57–74 (.435)			
