= 2019–20 Howard Bison men's basketball team =

American college basketball season

2019–20 Howard Bison men's basketball
- Conference: Mid-Eastern Athletic Conference
- Record: 4–29 (1–15 MEAC)
- Head coach: Kenny Blakeney (1st season)
- Assistant coaches: Eric Atkins; Jake Brown; Tyler Thornton
- Home arena: Burr Gymnasium

2019–20 MEAC men's basketball standings
	Conf.				Overall
Team	W		L	PCT	W		L	PCT
North Carolina Central	13	–	3	.813	18	–	13	.581
North Carolina A&T	12	–	4	.750	16	–	15	.516
Norfolk State	12	–	4	.750	16	–	15	.516
Florida A&M*	10	–	6	.625	12	–	15	.444
Bethune–Cookman	10	–	6	.625	16	–	14	.533
Morgan State	9	–	7	.563	15	–	16	.484
Coppin State	7	–	9	.438	11	–	20	.355
South Carolina State	6	–	10	.375	11	–	18	.379
MD Eastern Shore	4	–	12	.250	5	–	27	.156
Delaware State	4	–	12	.250	6	–	26	.188
Howard	1	–	15	.063	4	–	29	.121
* Ineligible for postseason due to improper certification of student-athletes Note: The 2020 MEAC tournament was canceled during the quarterfinals due to the COVID-19 pandemic.

The 2019–20 Howard Bison men's basketball team represented Howard University in the 2019–20 NCAA Division I men's basketball season. The Bison, led by first-year head coach Kenny Blakeney, played their home games at Burr Gymnasium in Washington, D.C. as members of the Mid-Eastern Athletic Conference (MEAC). They finished the season 4–29, 1–15 in MEAC play, to finish in last place. They defeated South Carolina State in the first round of the MEAC tournament before losing to North Carolina A&T in the quarterfinals.

== Previous season ==
The Bison finished the 2018–19 season 17–17, 10–6 in MEAC play, to finish in a tie for third place. In the MEAC tournament, they defeated Bethune–Cookman in the quarterfinals, before falling to Norfolk State in the semifinals. They were invited to the CBI, where they lost in the first round to Coastal Carolina.

On March 27, 2019, it was announced that head coach Kevin Nickelberry had resigned, ending his nine-year tenure with the team. On May 6, it was announced that Columbia assistant Kenny Blakeney would be Howard's next head coach.

== Roster ==
2019–20 Howard Bison men's basketball team
Players
Coaches

Pos.	#	Name	Height	Weight	Year	Hometown
G	0	Khalil Robinson	5 ft 11 in (1.8 m)	160 lb (73 kg)	Fr	Columbia, SC
F	1	Andre Toure	6 ft 8 in (2.03 m)	195 lb (88 kg)	So	Paris, France
G	3	Nate Garvey	6 ft 3 in (1.91 m)	180 lb (82 kg)	Sr	Nanuet, NY
G	4	Raymond Jr. Bethea	6 ft 6 in (1.98 m)	195 lb (88 kg)	So	Atlantic City, NJ
F	10	Zion Cousins	6 ft 8 in (2.03 m)	195 lb (88 kg)	Jr	Upper Marlboro, MD
G	11	Kyle Foster	6 ft 5 in (1.96 m)	172 lb (78 kg)	Jr	Hampton, VA
G	12	Garon Jones	6 ft 2 in (1.88 m)	170 lb (77 kg)	So	Monroe, NJ
G	13	Charles Williams	6 ft 6 in (1.98 m)	180 lb (82 kg)	Sr	Richmond, VA
F	14	William Settle	6 ft 10 in (2.08 m)	175 lb (79 kg)	Fr	Baltimore, MD
G	15	Phillip Jones	6 ft 0 in (1.83 m)	185 lb (84 kg)	Sr	Atlanta, GA
F	20	Michael Barber	6 ft 9 in (2.06 m)	225 lb (102 kg)	So	Jackson, MS
C	22	Cam Timmons	6 ft 11 in (2.11 m)	295 lb (134 kg)	Fr	Warrenton, VA
G	31	Wayne Jr. Bristol	6 ft 6 in (1.98 m)	175 lb (79 kg)	Fr	Upper Marlboro, MD
C	32	Liwayne Richardson	6 ft 10 in (2.08 m)	250 lb (113 kg)	Fr	Boca Raton, FL
G	33	Ian Lee	6 ft 1 in (1.85 m)	175 lb (79 kg)	Fr	Toronto, ON
C	35	Princewill Anosike	6 ft 9 in (2.06 m)	230 lb (104 kg)	So	Lagos, Nigeria

Head coach

- Kenny Blakeney (Duke)

Assistant coach(es)

- Eric Atkins (Notre Dame)
- Jake Brown (Middlebury)
- Tyler Thornton (Duke)

Legend

- (C) Team captain
- (S) Suspended
- (I) Ineligible
- (W) Walk-on
- Injured
- Current redshirt

Roster
Last update: September 15, 2024

== Schedule and results ==
Date time, TV	Rank^{#}	Opponent^{#}	Result	Record	Site (attendance) city, state
Exhibition
November 1, 2019*; 9:00 p.m.		District of Columbia	W 64–54		Burr Gymnasium; Washington, D.C.
Non-conference regular season
November 5, 2019*; 5:00 p.m.		Washington Adventist	L 68–71	0–1	Burr Gymnasium (1,435); Washington, D.C.
November 9, 2019*; 4:00 p.m., ESPN+		at George Washington	L 62–76	0–2	Charles E. Smith Center (3,677); Washington, D.C.
November 12, 2019*; 7:00 p.m., ACCNX/ESPN3		at Notre Dame; Men Against Breast Cancer Invitational	L 50–79	0–3	Edmund P. Joyce Center (6,190); South Bend, IN
November 15, 2019*; 2:00 p.m., ESPN3		vs. Robert Morris; Men Against Breast Cancer Invitational	L 65–85	0–4	Savage Arena (75); Toledo, OH
November 17, 2019*; 2:00 p.m., ESPN3		at Toledo; Men Against Breast Cancer Invitational	L 68–112	0–5	Savage Arena (4,220); Toledo, OH
November 21, 2019*; 8:00 p.m., ESPN3		at Marshall; Men Against Breast Cancer Invitational	L 63–91	0–6	Cam Henderson Center (5,343); Huntington, WV
November 23, 2019*; 3:30 p.m., ESPN+		at Ball State	L 69–100	0–7	Worthen Arena (4,192); Muncie, IN
November 26, 2019*; 7:00 p.m.		at American	L 69–86	0–8	Bender Arena (504); Washington, D.C.
November 30, 2019*; 4:00 p.m.		Mount St. Mary's	L 56–73	0–9	Burr Gymnasium (875); Washington, D.C.
December 5, 2019*; 7:00 p.m., ESPN+		at Hampton	W 94–91 ^{OT}	1–9	Hampton Convocation Center (4,512); Hampton, VA
December 14, 2019*; 12:00 p.m.		Appalachian State	L 59–81	1–10	Burr Gymnasium (924); Washington, D.C.
December 18, 2019*; 7:00 p.m.		Regent	W 105–47	2–10	Burr Gymnasium (131); Washington, D.C.
December 22, 2019*; 2:00 p.m.		Harvard	L 55–60	2–11	Burr Gymnasium (1,092); Washington, D.C.
December 30, 2019*; 7:00 p.m.		Penn	L 62–81	2–12	Burr Gymnasium (659); Washington, D.C.
MEAC regular season
January 4, 2020; 4:00 p.m.		at Maryland Eastern Shore	L 66–78	2–13 (0–1)	Hytche Athletic Center (555); Princess Anne, MD
January 6, 2020; 7:30 p.m.		Bethune–Cookman	L 73–102	2–14 (0–2)	Burr Gymnasium (289); Washington, D.C.
January 11, 2020; 4:20 p.m., FloHoops		Norfolk State	L 63–71	2–15 (0–3)	Burr Gymnasium (1,107); Washington, D.C.
January 13, 2020; 7:30 p.m.		South Carolina State	L 95–101 ^{OT}	2–16 (0–4)	Burr Gymnasium (1,732); Washington, D.C.
January 18, 2020; 4:00 p.m.		at Morgan State	L 58–68	2–17 (0–5)	Talmadge L. Hill Field House (1,025); Baltimore, MD
January 20, 2020*; 12:00 p.m.		Yale	L 75–89	2–18	Burr Gymnasium (2,097); Washington, D.C.
January 25, 2020; 4:40 p.m.		Florida A&M	L 83–87	2–19 (0–6)	Burr Gymnasium (1,906); Washington, D.C.
January 27, 2020; 7:30 p.m., FloHoops		at Coppin State	L 75–82	2–20 (0–7)	Physical Education Complex (824); Baltimore, MD
February 1, 2020; 4:25 p.m., FloHoops		Morgan State	L 83–89	2–21 (0–8)	Burr Gymnasium (1,327); Washington, D.C.
February 3, 2020; 7:30 p.m.		Coppin State	L 56–64	2–22 (0–9)	Burr Gymnasium (1,121); Washington, D.C.
February 8, 2020; 4:00 p.m.		at Florida A&M	L 78–82 ^{OT}	2–23 (0–10)	Teaching Gym (2,917); Tallahassee, FL
February 10, 2020; 7:30 p.m.		at Bethune–Cookman	L 68–87	2–24 (0–11)	Moore Gymnasium (870); Daytona Beach, FL
February 22, 2020; 6:00 p.m.		at North Carolina A&T	L 67–71	2–25 (0–12)	Corbett Sports Center (3,780); Greensboro, NC
February 24, 2020; 7:30 p.m.		at North Carolina Central	L 65–80	2–26 (0–13)	McDougald–McLendon Arena (1,496); Durham, NC
February 29, 2020; 6:00 p.m.		at Norfolk State	L 59–89	2–27 (0–14)	Joseph G. Echols Memorial Hall (4,217); Norfolk, VA
March 2, 2020; 7:30 p.m.		Maryland Eastern Shore	W 62–60	3–27 (1–14)	Burr Gymnasium (1,287); Washington, D.C.
March 5, 2020; 7:30 p.m.		Delaware State	L 88–100	3–28 (1–15)	Burr Gymnasium (1,121); Washington, D.C.
MEAC tournament
March 10, 2020; 8:00 p.m., FloHoops	(10)	vs. (7) South Carolina State; First round	W 70–63	4–28	Norfolk Scope; Norfolk, VA
March 11, 2020; 8:00 p.m., FloHoops	(10)	vs. (2) North Carolina A&T; Quarterfinals	L 77–86	4–29	Norfolk Scope; Norfolk, VA
*Non-conference game. ^{#}Rankings from AP poll. (#) Tournament seedings in parentheses. All times are in Eastern.
