= Jason Crafton =

American basketball coach

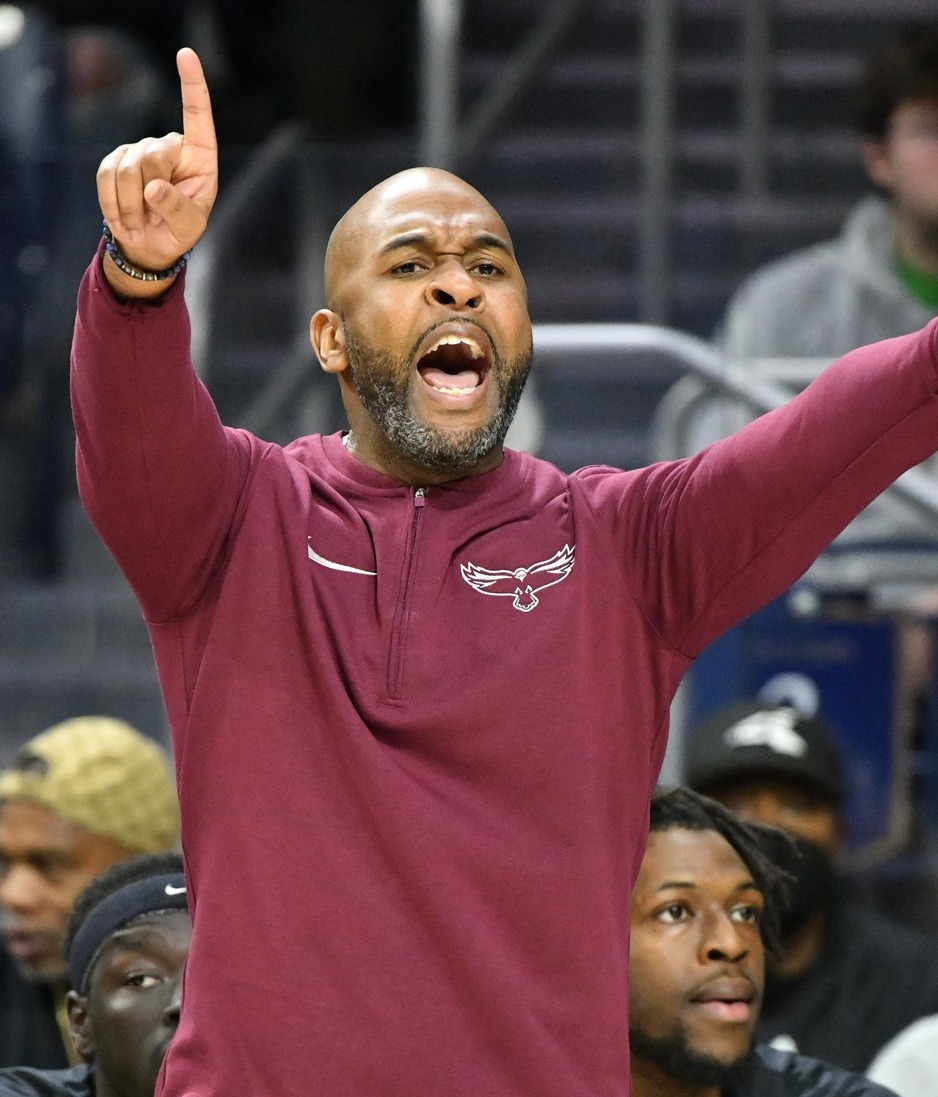
- Crafton in 2023

Current position
- Title: General Manager
- Team: Penn State
- Conference: Big Ten

Biographical details
- Born: January 30, 1982 (age 44); Brooklyn, New York, U.S.

Playing career
- 1999–2003: Nyack

Coaching career (HC unless noted)
- 2005–2010: Navy (men's assistant)
- 2010–2012: Navy (men's associate HC)
- 2012–2018: Nyack (men's)
- 2018–2019: Delaware Blue Coats (assistant)
- 2019–2024: Maryland Eastern Shore (men's)
- 2025–present: Penn State (Women's assistant)

Administrative career (AD unless noted)
- 2003–2005: Villanova (men's video coordinator)
- 2024–2025: Columbia (Men's Chief Program Strategist)
- 2025–Present: Penn State (Women's General Manager)

Head coaching record
- Overall: 90–184 (.328)
- Tournaments: 0–1 (TBC)

Jason Crafton (born January 30, 1982) is an American college basketball coach who is currently serving as General Manager for women's basketball at Penn State. He was previously the head coach for the Maryland Eastern Shore Hawks men's basketball team.

== Playing career ==
Crafton played college basketball at Nyack College, where he was named team captain his junior and senior seasons. He was also a member of the schools only CACC Championship Team in the 1999–2000 season.

== Coaching career ==
After graduation, Crafton joined Jay Wright's staff at Villanova as a video coordinator for two seasons until 2005, when he accepted an assistant coaching position at Navy where he'd serve under fellow former Villanova staffer Billy Lange as well as a season under Ed DeChellis. Crafton would return to Nyack to become the school's head men's basketball coach where from 2012 to 2018 before accepting an assistant coaching position with the Delaware Blue Coats of the NBA G League.

On April 24, 2019, Crafton was named the head coach at Maryland Eastern Shore.

During his five-year tenure as head coach at the University of Maryland Eastern Shore, Jason Crafton led the Hawks to significant improvements on the court. Under Crafton, Eastern Shore recorded notable non-conference victories over Temple, Fordham, Penn, Columbia, Marist, and Lehigh.

In the 2022–23 season, Crafton guided Maryland Eastern Shore to an 18–13 overall record, marking the program’s best winning percentage (.581) in 50 years. The team set school records for total steals (345) and steals per game (11.1), ranking first nationally in both steals per game and turnovers forced per contest (19.0).

Following the 2022–23 campaign, Crafton was also named a finalist for the Ben Jobe Coach of the Year Award, presented annually to the top minority head coach in NCAA Division I men’s basketball. In addition he was the runner up for the MEAC Conference Head Coach of the Year award.

On December 9, 2024, Crafton was formerly named as Chief Program Strategist for Men's Basketball at Columbia University. He helped the Lions achieve its best non-conference start in 50 years with an 11–2 record.

On June 17, 2025, Crafton became the first-ever general manager for Penn State Lady Lions Basketball Team. He is responsible for roster building and maintenance, generating NIL strategies and overall program development on and off the court.

== Head coaching record ==
=== NCAA DII ===
Record table
Season	Team	Overall	Conference	Standing	Postseason
Nyack (CACC) (2012–2018)
2012–13	Nyack	5–20	3–15	7th (North)	
2013–14	Nyack	10–16	8–11	5th (North)	
2014–15	Nyack	7–19	6–13	6th (North)	
2015–16	Nyack	11–15	8–11	5th (North)	
2016–17	Nyack	7–19	3–16	7th (North)	
2017–18	Nyack	7–19	7–12	5th (North)	
Nyack:		47–108 (.303)	35–78 (.310)		
Total:		47–108 (.303)			
National champion Postseason invitational champion Conference regular season champion Conference regular season and conference tournament champion Division regular season champion Division regular season and conference tournament champion Conference tournament champion

=== NCAA DI ===
Record table
Season	Team	Overall	Conference	Standing	Postseason
Maryland Eastern Shore (MEAC) (2019–2024)
2019–20	Maryland Eastern Shore	5–27	4–12	T–9th	
2020–21	Maryland Eastern Shore	Season Canceled (Covid)	N/A	N/A	N/A
2021–22	Maryland Eastern Shore	11–16	6–8	T–6th	TBC First Round
2022–23	Maryland Eastern Shore	18–13	9–5	T–3rd	
2023–24	Maryland Eastern Shore	9–20	4–10	7th	
Maryland Eastern Shore:		43–76 (.361)	23–35 (.397)		
Total:		43–76 (.361)			
National champion Postseason invitational champion Conference regular season champion Conference regular season and conference tournament champion Division regular season champion Division regular season and conference tournament champion Conference tournament champion
