= 2019–20 South Carolina State Bulldogs basketball team =

American college basketball season

2019–20 South Carolina State Bulldogs basketball
- Conference: Mid-Eastern Athletic Conference
- Record: 11–18 (6–10 MEAC)
- Head coach: Murray Garvin (7th season)
- Assistant coaches: Rio Pitt; Bobby Collins; Ed Stephens
- Home arena: SHM Memorial Center

2019–20 MEAC men's basketball standings
	Conf.				Overall
Team	W		L	PCT	W		L	PCT
North Carolina Central	13	–	3	.813	18	–	13	.581
North Carolina A&T	12	–	4	.750	16	–	15	.516
Norfolk State	12	–	4	.750	16	–	15	.516
Florida A&M*	10	–	6	.625	12	–	15	.444
Bethune–Cookman	10	–	6	.625	16	–	14	.533
Morgan State	9	–	7	.563	15	–	16	.484
Coppin State	7	–	9	.438	11	–	20	.355
South Carolina State	6	–	10	.375	11	–	18	.379
MD Eastern Shore	4	–	12	.250	5	–	27	.156
Delaware State	4	–	12	.250	6	–	26	.188
Howard	1	–	15	.063	4	–	29	.121
* Ineligible for postseason due to improper certification of student-athletes Note: The 2020 MEAC tournament was canceled during the quarterfinals due to the COVID-19 pandemic.

The 2019–20 South Carolina State Bulldogs basketball team represented South Carolina State University in the 2019–20 NCAA Division I men's basketball season. The Bulldogs, led by seventh-year head coach Murray Garvin, played their home games at SHM Memorial Center in Orangeburg, South Carolina as members of the Mid-Eastern Athletic Conference. They finished the season 11–18, 6–10 in MEAC play to finish in eighth place. They lost in the first round of the MEAC tournament to Howard.

== Previous season ==
The Bulldogs finished the 2018–19 season 8–26 overall, 5–11 in MEAC play, finishing in a tie for 9th place. In the MEAC tournament, they defeated Maryland Eastern Shore in the first round, before falling to Norfolk State in the quarterfinals.

== Roster ==
2019–20 South Carolina State Bulldogs men's basketball team
Players
Coaches

Pos.	#	Name	Height	Weight	Year	Hometown
G	0	Isaiah Felder	6 ft 0 in (1.83 m)	180 lb (82 kg)	GS	Orangeburg, South Carolina
G	1	Tariq Simmons	6 ft 3 in (1.91 m)	200 lb (91 kg)	Jr	Columbia, South Carolina
F	2	Tashombe Riley	6 ft 7 in (2.01 m)	210 lb (95 kg)	GS	Orangeburg, South Carolina
G	3	Rayshawn Neal	5 ft 10 in (1.78 m)	205 lb (93 kg)	Jr	Greenville, South Carolina
G	4	Zacchaeus Sellers	6 ft 1 in (1.85 m)	175 lb (79 kg)	Sr	Cheraw, South Carolina
F	5	Ozante Fields	6 ft 7 in (2.01 m)	225 lb (102 kg)	Sr	Denmark, South Carolina
G	10	Rahsaan Edwards	6 ft 0 in (1.83 m)	205 lb (93 kg)	Fr	Hagerstown, Maryland
F	11	Armani Hill	6 ft 7 in (2.01 m)	225 lb (102 kg)	Sr	Rock Hill, South Carolina
G/F	12	Omar Croskey	6 ft 5 in (1.96 m)	200 lb (91 kg)	Fr	Sumter, South Carolina
G	14	Jahmari Etienne	6 ft 3 in (1.91 m)	190 lb (86 kg)	Sr	Atlanta, Georgia
G	15	Trushaun Moorer	6 ft 2 in (1.88 m)	190 lb (86 kg)	RS Jr	Summerville, South Carolina
G	20	Robert Flint, Jr.	6 ft 2 in (1.88 m)	205 lb (93 kg)	GS	Greenville, South Carolina
F	21	David Bottenberg	6 ft 8 in (2.03 m)	220 lb (100 kg)	Sr	Rockville, Maryland
F	22	Quamain Nelson	6 ft 7 in (2.01 m)	215 lb (98 kg)	Jr	Great Falls, South Carolina
F	23	Shaquan "Shaq" Davis	6 ft 5 in (1.96 m)	210 lb (95 kg)	Fr	Summerville, South Carolina
F	24	Ian Kinard	6 ft 8 in (2.03 m)	215 lb (98 kg)	Sr	Clinton, South Carolina
F	35	Damani Applewhite	6 ft 8 in (2.03 m)	200 lb (91 kg)	Sr	Fayetteville, North Carolina
F	55	Elafayette Stone	6 ft 10 in (2.08 m)	325 lb (147 kg)	Jr	Clinton, South Carolina

Head coach

- Murray Garvin (Eastern Kentucky)

Assistant coach(es)

- Rio Pitt (South Carolina State)
- Bobby Collins (Eastern Kentucky)
- Ed Stephens (South Carolina State)

Legend

- (C) Team captain
- (S) Suspended
- (I) Ineligible
- (W) Walk-on
- Injured
- Current redshirt

Roster
Last update: December 28, 2019

== Schedule and results ==
Date time, TV	Rank^{#}	Opponent^{#}	Result	Record	Site (attendance) city, state
Non-conference regular season
November 5, 2019*; 8:00 pm, ESPN3		at No. 14 Memphis	L 64–97	0–1	FedExForum (16,002); Memphis, TN
November 8, 2019*; 7:00 pm, ESPN3		Bob Jones	W 79–64	1–1	SHM Memorial Center (5,025); Orangeburg, SC
November 12, 2019*; 7:00 pm, ESPN+		at Liberty	L 39–65	1–2	Vines Center (3,084); Lynchburg, VA
November 18, 2019*; 7:00 pm		Wilberforce; Vanderbilt Invitational	W 103–79	2–2	SHM Memorial Center (479); Orangeburg, SC
November 22, 2019*; 8:00 pm, SECN+		at Vanderbilt; Vanderbilt Invitational	L 60–97	2–3	Memorial Gymnasium (8,725); Nashville, TN
November 25, 2019*; 8:00 pm, ESPN+		at Austin Peay; Vanderbilt Invitational	L 66–92	2–4	Dunn Center (1,027); Clarksville, TN
November 27, 2019*; 2:00 pm, ESPN3		at Tulsa; Vanderbilt Invitational	L 47–78	2–5	Reynolds Center (2,870); Tulsa, OK
December 7, 2019*; 2:00 pm		Presbyterian	W 80–68	3–5	SHM Memorial Center (239); Orangeburg, SC
December 11, 2019*; 7:00 pm		UNC Asheville	W 90–85	4–5	SHM Memorial Center (198); Orangeburg, SC
December 18, 2019*; 7:00 pm		USC Upstate	L 70–73	4–6	SHM Memorial Center (312); Orangeburg, SC
December 21, 2019*; 4:00 pm		at College of Charleston	L 61–73	4–7	TD Arena (3,651); Charleston, SC
December 30, 2019*; 2:00 pm, ESPN+		at Jacksonville	W 58–52	5–7	Swisher Gymnasium (657); Jacksonville, FL
MEAC regular season
January 4, 2020; 4:00 pm		at Coppin State	W 79–75	6–7 (1–0)	Physical Education Complex (672); Baltimore, MD
January 6, 2020; 7:30 pm		at Morgan State	L 63–77	6–8 (1–1)	Talmadge L. Hill Field House (872); Baltimore, MD
January 13, 2020; 7:30 pm		at Howard	W 101–95 ^{OT}	7–8 (2–1)	Burr Gymnasium (1,732); Washington, D.C.
January 18, 2020; 4:00 pm		Florida A&M	W 81–65	8–8 (3–1)	SHM Memorial Center (499); Orangeburg, SC
January 20, 2020; 7:30 pm		Maryland Eastern Shore	W 68–53	9–8 (4–1)	SHM Memorial Center; Orangeburg, SC
January 25, 2020; 6:30 pm		at Norfolk State	L 62–73	9–9 (4–2)	Joseph G. Echols Memorial Hall (2,374); Norfolk, VA
January 27, 2020; 7:30 pm		Bethune–Cookman	L 74–78	9–10 (4–3)	SHM Memorial Center; Orangeburg, SC
February 1, 2020; 4:00 pm		at North Carolina Central	L 56–73	9–11 (4–4)	McDougald–McLendon Arena (1,229); Durham, NC
February 3, 2020; 7:30 pm		at North Carolina A&T	L 63–78	9–12 (4–5)	Corbett Sports Center (4,139); Greensboro, NC
February 10, 2020; 7:30 pm		Delaware State	W 100–86	10–12 (5–5)	SHM Memorial Center; Orangeburg, SC
February 15, 2020; 4:00 pm		Coppin State	W 70–66	11–12 (6–5)	SHM Memorial Center; Orangeburg, SC
February 17, 2020; 7:30 pm		Morgan State	L 72–78	11–13 (6–6)	SHM Memorial Center (344); Orangeburg, SC
February 22, 2020; 4:00 pm		at Bethune–Cookman	L 65–69 ^{OT}	11–14 (6–7)	Moore Gymnasium (804); Daytona Beach, FL
February 24, 2020; 8:00 pm		at Florida A&M	L 56–62	11–15 (6–8)	Teaching Gym (1,793); Tallahassee, FL
February 29, 2020; 4:00 pm		North Carolina Central	L 82–83 ^{2OT}	11–16 (6–9)	SHM Memorial Center (477); Orangeburg, SC
March 2, 2020; 7:30 pm		North Carolina A&T	L 65–76	11–17 (6–10)	SHM Memorial Center; Orangeburg, SC
MEAC tournament
March 10, 2020; 8:00 pm, FloSports	(7)	vs. (10) Howard; First round	L 63–70	11–18	Norfolk Scope; Norfolk, VA
*Non-conference game. ^{#}Rankings from AP Poll. (#) Tournament seedings in parentheses. All times are in Eastern.
