= 2020 MEAC men's basketball tournament =

- Classification: Division I
- Season: 2019–20
- Teams: 10
- Site: Norfolk Scope; Norfolk, Virginia
- Television: FloHoops, ESPN2

2019–20 MEAC men's basketball standings
	Conf.				Overall
Team	W		L	PCT	W		L	PCT
North Carolina Central	13	–	3	.813	18	–	13	.581
North Carolina A&T	12	–	4	.750	16	–	15	.516
Norfolk State	12	–	4	.750	16	–	15	.516
Florida A&M*	10	–	6	.625	12	–	15	.444
Bethune–Cookman	10	–	6	.625	16	–	14	.533
Morgan State	9	–	7	.563	15	–	16	.484
Coppin State	7	–	9	.438	11	–	20	.355
South Carolina State	6	–	10	.375	11	–	18	.379
MD Eastern Shore	4	–	12	.250	5	–	27	.156
Delaware State	4	–	12	.250	6	–	26	.188
Howard	1	–	15	.063	4	–	29	.121
* Ineligible for postseason due to improper certification of student-athletes Note: The 2020 MEAC tournament was canceled during the quarterfinals due to the COVID-19 pandemic.

The 2020 Mid-Eastern Athletic Conference men's basketball tournament was the postseason men's basketball tournament for the Mid-Eastern Athletic Conference. The tournament was scheduled to be held from March 10 through March 14, 2020 at the Norfolk Scope in Norfolk, Virginia. The winner would have received the conference's automatic bid to the NCAA tournament.

The tournament was canceled on March 12, 2020, after four games had already been played due to the COVID-19 pandemic. The tournament was the last scheduled conference tournament to be canceled.

== Seeds ==
10 eligible teams (Florida A&M self-imposed a postseason ban for 2020 due to improper certification of student-athletes) were seeded by record within the conference, with a tiebreaker system to seed teams with identical conference records. The top four teams received a first-round bye.

Seed	School	Conference	Tiebreaker
1	North Carolina Central	13–3	
2	North Carolina A&T	12–4	1–0 vs. Norfolk State
3	Norfolk State	12–4	0–1 vs. North Carolina A&T
4	Bethune–Cookman	10–6	
5	Morgan State	9–7	
6	Coppin State	7–9	
7	South Carolina State	6–10	
8	Delaware State	4–12	1–1 vs. North Carolina Central
9	Maryland Eastern Shore	4–12	0–2 vs. North Carolina Central
10	Howard	1–15	

== Schedule ==
Session	Game	Time	Matchup	Score	Television
First round – Tuesday, March 10
1	1	6:00 pm	No. 8 Delaware State vs. No. 9 Maryland Eastern Shore	68–64	FLOHOOPS (ppv)
1	2	8:00 pm	No. 7 South Carolina State vs. No. 10 Howard	63–70	FLOHOOPS (ppv)
Quarterfinals – Wednesday, March 11
2	3	6:00 pm	No. 1 North Carolina Central vs. No. 8 Delaware State	92–75	FLOHOOPS (ppv)
2	4	8:00 pm	No. 2 North Carolina A&T vs. No. 10 Howard	86–77	FLOHOOPS (ppv)
Quarterfinals – Thursday, March 12
3	5	6:00 pm	No. 4 Bethune–Cookman vs. No. 5 Morgan State	canceled	FLOHOOPS (ppv)
3	6	8:00 pm	No. 3 Norfolk State vs. No. 6 Coppin State	canceled	FLOHOOPS (ppv)
Semifinals – Friday, March 13
4	7	6:00 pm	No. 1 North Carolina Central vs Game 5 Winner	canceled	FLOHOOPS (ppv)
4	8	8:00 pm	No. 2 North Carolina A&T vs Game 6 Winner	canceled	FLOHOOPS (ppv)
Championship – Saturday, March 14
5	9	1:00 pm	Game 7 Winner vs Game 8 Winner	canceled	ESPN2
Game times in EST. Rankings denote tournament seeding.

== Bracket ==
First round March 10; FLOHOOPS
8	Delaware State	68
9	UMES	64
7	South Carolina State	63
10	Howard	70

Quarterfinals; March 11 and 12; FLOHOOPS
1	North Carolina Central	92
8	Delaware State	75
4	Bethune–Cookman
5	Morgan State
2	North Carolina A&T	86
10	Howard	77
3	Norfolk State
6	Coppin State

Semifinals; March 13; FLOHOOPS
1	North Carolina Central
2	North Carolina A&T

Championship; March 14; ESPN2

* denotes overtime period
