= Willie Jones (basketball coach) =

American basketball player and coach (born c. 1981)

Biographical details
- Born: 1981 (age 44–45)

Playing career
- 1999–2003: South Carolina State

Coaching career (HC unless noted)
- 2005–2006: Tennessee State (GA)
- 2005–2006: LeMoyne–Owen (assistant)
- 2006–2007: South Carolina State (assistant)
- 2007–2009: Northwest Florida State (assistant)
- 2009–2011: Georgia Southern (assistant)
- 2011–2014: Jacksonville (assistant)
- 2014–2015: West Nassau HS
- 2015–2016: Florida A&M (assistant)
- 2016–2019: North Carolina A&T (assistant)
- 2019–2022: North Carolina A&T

Head coaching record
- Overall: 37–35 (.514)

Accomplishments and honors

Awards
- MEAC Coach of the Year (2020)

Willie Jones (born c. 1981) is an American college basketball coach. He was most recently the head coach for North Carolina A&T Aggies from 2019 to 2022. Jones became the interim coach of the Aggies on December 24, 2019 for Jay Joyner, when the team was a member of the Mid-Eastern Athletic Conference (MEAC), and led the team to a 14–5 overall record and a second place MEAC finish. Jones was named MEAC Coach of the Year for the 2019–20 season.

Jones was elevated to the head coach spot on June 18, 2020. On August 18, 2022, Jones was fired and succeeded by assistant coach Phillip Shumpert.
