= MEAC men's basketball tournament =

Conference championship tournament in basketball

- Conference basketball championship
- Sport: Basketball
- Conference: Mid-Eastern Athletic Conference
- Number of teams: 11
- Format: Single-elimination tournament
- Current stadium: Norfolk Scope
- Current location: Norfolk, VA
- Played: 1972–present
- Last contest: 2025
- Current champion: Norfolk State Spartans
- Most championships: North Carolina A&T Aggies (16)
- TV partner: ESPNU
- Official website: www.meachoops.com

Sponsors
- ESPNU, Russel Athletics, State Farm Insurance, Coca-Cola, Nike, Wachovia

The MEAC men's basketball tournament (popularly known as the MEAC tournament) is the conference championship tournament in basketball for the Mid-Eastern Athletic Conference (MEAC). The tournament has been held every year since 1972. It is a single-elimination tournament and seeding is based on regular season records. The winner, declared conference champion, receives the conference's automatic bid to the NCAA men's basketball tournament.

== Results ==
Year	Champion	Score	Runner-up	Tournament MVP	Location
1972	North Carolina A&T	71–62	Howard	Robert Lewis (HU)	Cameron Indoor Stadium • Durham, NC
1973	North Carolina A&T	86–81	Howard	William Harris (NCAT)	Cameron Indoor Stadium • Durham, NC
1974	Maryland Eastern Shore	77–62	Morgan State	Talvin Skinner (UMES)	Baltimore Civic Center • Baltimore, MD
1975	North Carolina A&T	86–77	Morgan State	Marvin Webster (MSU)	Baltimore Civic Center • Baltimore, MD
1976	North Carolina A&T	82–77	Morgan State	James Sparrow (NCAT)	Greensboro Coliseum • Greensboro, NC
1977	North Carolina A&T	66–63	Morgan State	Eric Evans (MSU)	Greensboro Coliseum • Greensboro, NC
1978	North Carolina A&T	82–77	Howard	James Sparrow (NCAT)	Greensboro Coliseum • Greensboro, NC
1979	North Carolina A&T	48–46	Howard	Larry Spriggs (HU)	Greensboro Coliseum • Greensboro, NC
1980	Howard	78–69	Maryland Eastern Shore	Larry Spriggs (HU)	Winston-Salem Memorial Coliseum • Winston-Salem, NC
1981	Howard	66-63	North Carolina A&T	Unknown	Winston-Salem Memorial Coliseum • Winston-Salem, NC
1982	North Carolina A&T	79–67	Howard	Eric Boyd (NCAT)	Winston-Salem Memorial Coliseum • Winston-Salem, NC
1983	North Carolina A&T	71–64	Howard	Joe Binion (NCAT)	Greensboro Coliseum • Greensboro, NC
1984	North Carolina A&T	65–58	Howard	Eric Boyd (NCAT)	Greensboro Coliseum • Greensboro, NC
1985	North Carolina A&T	71–69	Howard	Eric Boyd (NCAT)	The Palestra • Philadelphia, PA
1986	North Carolina A&T	53–52	Howard	Thomas Griffis (NCAT)	Philadelphia Civic Center • Philadelphia, PA
1987	North Carolina A&T	79–58	Howard	Thomas Griffis (NCAT)	Greensboro Coliseum • Greensboro, NC
1988	North Carolina A&T	101–86	Florida A&M	Claude Williams (NCAT)	Greensboro Coliseum • Greensboro, NC
1989	South Carolina State	83–79	Florida A&M	Travis Williams (SCSU)	Greensboro Coliseum • Greensboro, NC
1990	Coppin State	54–50	North Carolina A&T	Reggie Isaac (CSU)	Greensboro Coliseum • Greensboro, NC
1991	Florida A&M	84–80	Delaware State	Kenneth Davis (Florida A&M)	Norfolk Scope • Norfolk, VA
1992	Howard	67–65	Florida A&M	Howard Holley (HU)	Norfolk Scope • Norfolk, VA
1993	Coppin State	80–53	Delaware State	Dion Schultz (CSU)	Norfolk Scope • Norfolk, VA
1994	North Carolina A&T	87–70	South Carolina State	Phillip Allen (NCAT)	Talmadge L. Hill Field House • Baltimore, MD (The 1994 Championship Game was played at the Baltimore Civic Center.)
1995	North Carolina A&T	66–64	Coppin State	Phillip Allen (NCAT)	Talmadge L. Hill Field House • Baltimore, MD (The 1994 Championship Game was played at the Baltimore Civic Center.)
1996	South Carolina State	69–56	Coppin State	Derrick Patterson (SCSU)	Leon County Civic Center • Tallahassee, FL
1997	Coppin State	81–74 (OT)	North Carolina A&T	Terquin Mott (CSU)	Joseph G. Echols Memorial Hall • Norfolk, VA
1998	South Carolina State	66–61	Coppin State	Roderick Blakney (SCSU)	Richmond Coliseum • Richmond, VA
1999	Florida A&M	64–61	South Carolina State	Monroe Pippins (Florida A&M)	Richmond Coliseum • Richmond, VA
2000	South Carolina State	70–53	Coppin State	Mike Waitre (SCSU)	Arthur Ashe Athletic Center and Richmond Coliseum • Richmond, VA
2001	Hampton	70–68	South Carolina State	Tarvis Williams (Hampton)	Arthur Ashe Athletic Center and Richmond Coliseum • Richmond, VA
2002	Hampton	80-62	Howard	Tommy Adams (Hampton)	Arthur Ashe Athletic Center and Richmond Coliseum • Richmond, VA
2003	South Carolina State	72–67	Hampton	Dustin Braddick (SCSU)	Arthur Ashe Athletic Center and Richmond Coliseum • Richmond, VA
2004	Florida A&M	58–51	Coppin State	Terrence Woods (Florida A&M)	Arthur Ashe Athletic Center and Richmond Coliseum • Richmond, VA
2005	Delaware State	55–53	Hampton	Jahsha Bluntt (DSU)	Arthur Ashe Athletic Center and Richmond Coliseum • Richmond, VA
2006	Hampton	60–56	Delaware State	Rashad West (Hampton)	RBC Center • Raleigh, NC
2007	Florida A&M	58–56	Delaware State	Brian Greene (Florida A&M)	RBC Center • Raleigh, NC
2008	Coppin State	62–60	Morgan State	Tywain McKee (CSU)	RBC Center • Raleigh, NC
2009	Morgan State	83–69	Norfolk State	Reggie Holmes (MSU)	LJVM Coliseum • Winston-Salem, NC
2010	Morgan State	68–61	South Carolina State	Kevin Thompson (MSU)	LJVM Coliseum • Winston-Salem, NC
2011	Hampton	60–55	Morgan State	Brandon Tunnell (Hampton)	LJVM Coliseum • Winston-Salem, NC
2012	Norfolk State	73–70	Bethune-Cookman	Kyle O'Quinn (NSU)	LJVM Coliseum • Winston-Salem, NC
2013	North Carolina A&T	57–54	Morgan State	Adrian Powell (NCAT)	Norfolk Scope • Norfolk, VA
2014	North Carolina Central	71–62	Morgan State	Jeremy Ingram (NCCU)	Norfolk Scope • Norfolk, VA
2015	Hampton	82–61	Delaware State	Deron Powers (Hampton)	Norfolk Scope • Norfolk, VA
2016	Hampton	81–69	South Carolina State	Reginald Johnson (Hampton)	Norfolk Scope • Norfolk, VA
2017	North Carolina Central	67–59	Norfolk State	Patrick Cole (NCCU)	Norfolk Scope • Norfolk, VA
2018	North Carolina Central	71–63	Hampton	Pablo Rivas (NCCU)	Norfolk Scope • Norfolk, VA
2019	North Carolina Central	50–47	Norfolk State	Raasean Davis (NCCU)	Norfolk Scope • Norfolk, VA
2020	Cancelled due to the coronavirus pandemic				Norfolk Scope • Norfolk, VA
2021	Norfolk State	71–63	Morgan State	Joe Bryant Jr. (NSU)	Norfolk Scope • Norfolk, VA
2022	Norfolk State	72–57	Coppin State	Joe Bryant Jr. (NSU)	Norfolk Scope • Norfolk, VA
2023	Howard	65–64	Norfolk State	Jelani Williams (HU)	Norfolk Scope • Norfolk, VA
2024	Howard	70–67	Delaware State	Jordan Hairston (HU)	Norfolk Scope • Norfolk, VA
2025	Norfolk State	66–65	South Carolina State	Brian Moore Jr. (NSU)	Norfolk Scope • Norfolk, VA
2026	Howard	70–63	North Carolina Central	Bryce Harris (HU)	Norfolk Scope • Norfolk, VA

== Tournament championships by school ==
Former MEAC members are indicated in italics.

School	Tournament Championships	Last Championship
North Carolina A&T	16	2013
Hampton	6	2016
Howard	6	2026
South Carolina State	5	2003
Coppin State	4	2008
Florida A&M	4	2007
Norfolk State	4	2025
North Carolina Central	4	2019
Morgan State	3	2010
Delaware State	1	2005
Maryland Eastern Shore	1	1974

== NCAA Tournament appearances ==
Year	MEAC Team	Opponent	Result
1981	(12) Howard	(5) Wyoming	L 43–78
1982	(12) North Carolina A&T	(5) West Virginia	L 72–102
1983	(12) North Carolina A&T	(12) Princeton	L 42–51
1984	(12) North Carolina A&T	(12) Morehead State	L 69–70
1985	(16) North Carolina A&T	(1) Oklahoma	L 83–96
1986	(16) North Carolina A&T	(1) Kansas	L 46–71
1987	(15) North Carolina A&T	(2) Alabama	L 71–88
1988	(14) North Carolina A&T	(3) Syracuse	L 55–69
1989	(12) South Carolina State	(5) NC State	L 66–81
1990	(15) Coppin State	(2) Syracuse	L 48–70
1991	No appearance, Florida A&M lost a play-in against Northeast Louisiana		
1992	(16) Howard	(1) Kansas	L 67–100
1993	(15) Coppin State	(2) Cincinnati	L 66–93
1994	(16) North Carolina A&T	(1) Arkansas	L 79–94
1995	(16) North Carolina A&T	(1) Wake Forest	L 47–79
1996	(15) South Carolina State	(2) Kansas	L 54–92
1997	(15) Coppin State	(2) South Carolina (10) Texas	W 78–65; L 81–82
1998	(15) South Carolina State	(2) Kentucky	L 67–82
1999	(16) Florida A&M	(1) Duke	L 58–99
2000	(16) South Carolina State	(1) Stanford	L 65–84
2001	(15) Hampton	(2) Iowa State (10) Georgetown	W 58–57; L 57–76
2002	(15) Hampton	(2) Connecticut	L 67–78
2003	(16) South Carolina State	(1) Oklahoma	L 54–71
2004	(16a) Florida A&M	(16b) Lehigh (1) Kentucky	W 72–57; L 76–96
2005	(16) Delaware State	(1) Duke	L 46–57
2006	(16) Hampton	(16) Monmouth	L 49–71
2007	(16) Florida A&M	(16) Niagara	L 69–77
2008	(16b) Coppin State	(16a) Mount St. Mary's	L 60–69
2009	(15) Morgan State	(2) Oklahoma	L 54–82
2010	(15) Morgan State	(2) West Virginia	L 50–77
2011	(16) Hampton	(1) Duke	L 45–87
2012	(15) Norfolk State	(2) Missouri (7) Florida	W 86–84; L 50–84
2013	(16) North Carolina A&T	(16) Liberty (1) Louisville	W 73–72; L 48–79
2014	(14) North Carolina Central	(3) Iowa State	L 75–93
2015	(16) Hampton	(16) Manhattan (1) Kentucky	W 74–64; L 56–79
2016	(16) Hampton	(1) Virginia	L 45–81
2017	(16) North Carolina Central	(16) UC Davis	L 63–67
2018	(16) North Carolina Central	(16) Texas Southern	L 46–64
2019	(16) North Carolina Central	(16) North Dakota State	L 74–78
2021	(16) Norfolk State	(16) Appalachian State (1) Gonzaga	W 54–53; L 55–98
2022	(16) Norfolk State	(1) Baylor	L 49–85
2023	(16) Howard	(1) Kansas	L 68–96
2024	(16) Howard	(16) Wagner	L 68–71
2025	(16) Norfolk State	(1) Florida	L 69–95
2026	(16) Howard	(16) UMBC (1) Michigan	W 86–83; L 80–101

- 2020 NCAA tournament was canceled due to COVID-19.

== Television coverage ==
Year	Network	Play-by-play	Analyst	Ref
2024	ESPN2	Anish Shroff	John "Jet" Williams	
2023	ESPN2	Derek Jones	John "Jet" Williams	
2022	ESPN2	Kevin Fitzgerald	King McClure	
2021	ESPN2	John Schriffen	Cory Alexander	
2020	ESPN2	Derek Jones	Malcolm Huckaby	
2019	ESPN2	Roy Philpott	Cory Alexander	
2018	ESPN2	Roy Philpott	Malcolm Huckaby	
2017	ESPN2	Roy Philpott	Stan Lewter	
2016	ESPN2	Roy Philpott	Craig Robinson	
2015	ESPN2	Jason Benetti	Craig Robinson	
2014	ESPN2	Tom Hart	Stan Lewter	
2013	ESPN2	Jason Benetti	Stan Lewter	
2012	ESPN2	Justin Kutcher		
2011	ESPN2	Justin Kutcher	Dickey Simpkins	
2010	ESPN2	Allen Hopkins	Stephen Howard	
2009	ESPNU	Charlie Neal	Nate Ross	
2008	ESPN Classic	Charlie Neal	Stan Lewter	
2007	ESPN Classic	Charlie Neal	Stan Lewter	
1999	ESPN2	Chris Marlowe		

== See also ==
- MEAC women's basketball tournament
