= Mid-Eastern Athletic Conference Men's Basketball Player of the Year =

US basketball award

- Awarded for: the most outstanding basketball player in the Mid-Eastern Athletic Conference
- Country: United States

History
- First award: 1972
- Most recent: Bryce Harris, Howard

The Mid-Eastern Athletic Conference Men's Basketball Player of the Year is an annual award given to the Mid-Eastern Athletic Conference's (MEAC) most outstanding player. The award was first given following the 1971–72 season. There has never been a tie for co-player of the year in the award's history, nor has there been a national player of the year. Two players have been named the MEAC Player of the Year three times: Marvin Webster of Morgan State (1973–75) and Joe Binion of North Carolina A&T (1982–84). The school with the most all-time honorees is North Carolina A&T, now a member of the Big South Conference, which has had nine winners, but its last award before its 2021 departure was in 1988. Among current members, Coppin State, Norfolk State and Howard have the most recipients with eight each. The only current member of the MEAC without a winner is Maryland Eastern Shore.

== Key ==
†	Co-Players of the Year
*	Awarded a national player of the year award that same season: Helms Foundation College Basketball Player of the Year (1904–05 to 1978–79); UPI College Basketball Player of the Year (1954–55 to 1995–96); Oscar Robertson Trophy (1958–59 to present); Naismith College Player of the Year (1968–69 to present); John R. Wooden Award (1976–77 to present)
Player (X)	Denotes the number of times the player has been awarded the MEAC Player of the Year award at that point

== Winners ==
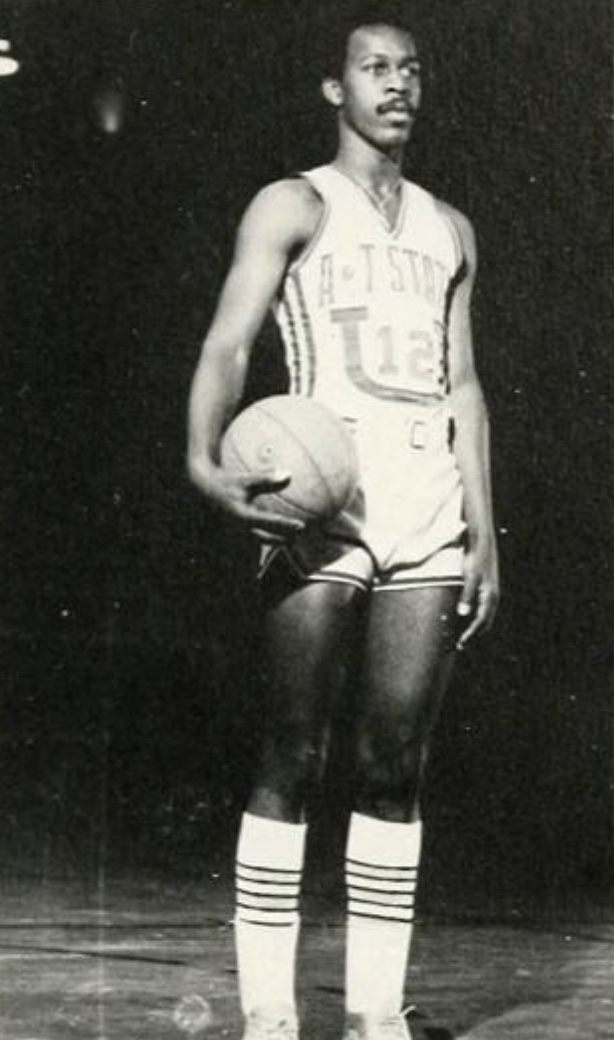
Elmer Austin, North Carolina A&T, 1972

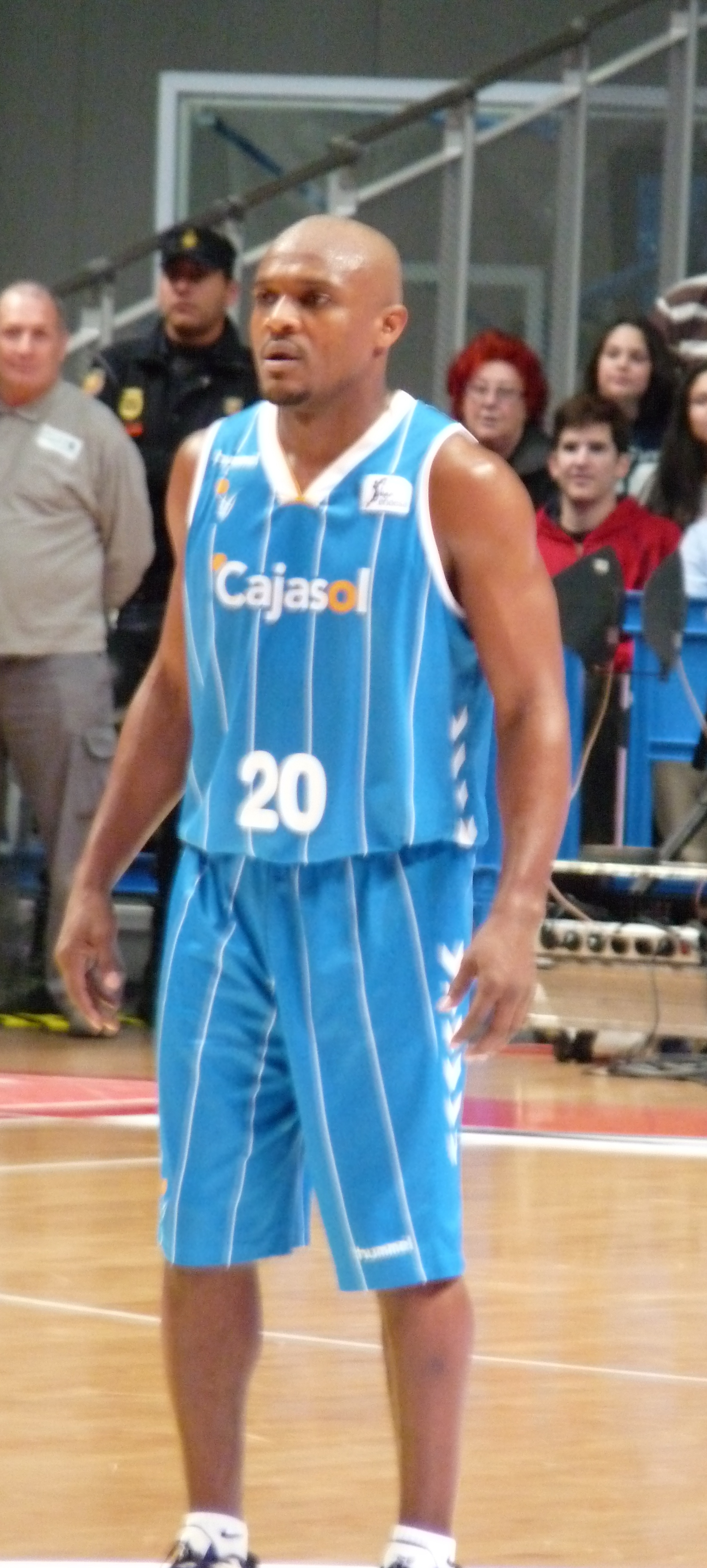
Roderick Blakney, South Carolina State, 1997

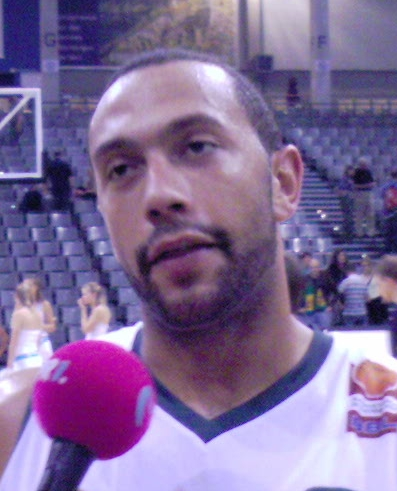
Tommy Adams, Hampton, 2002

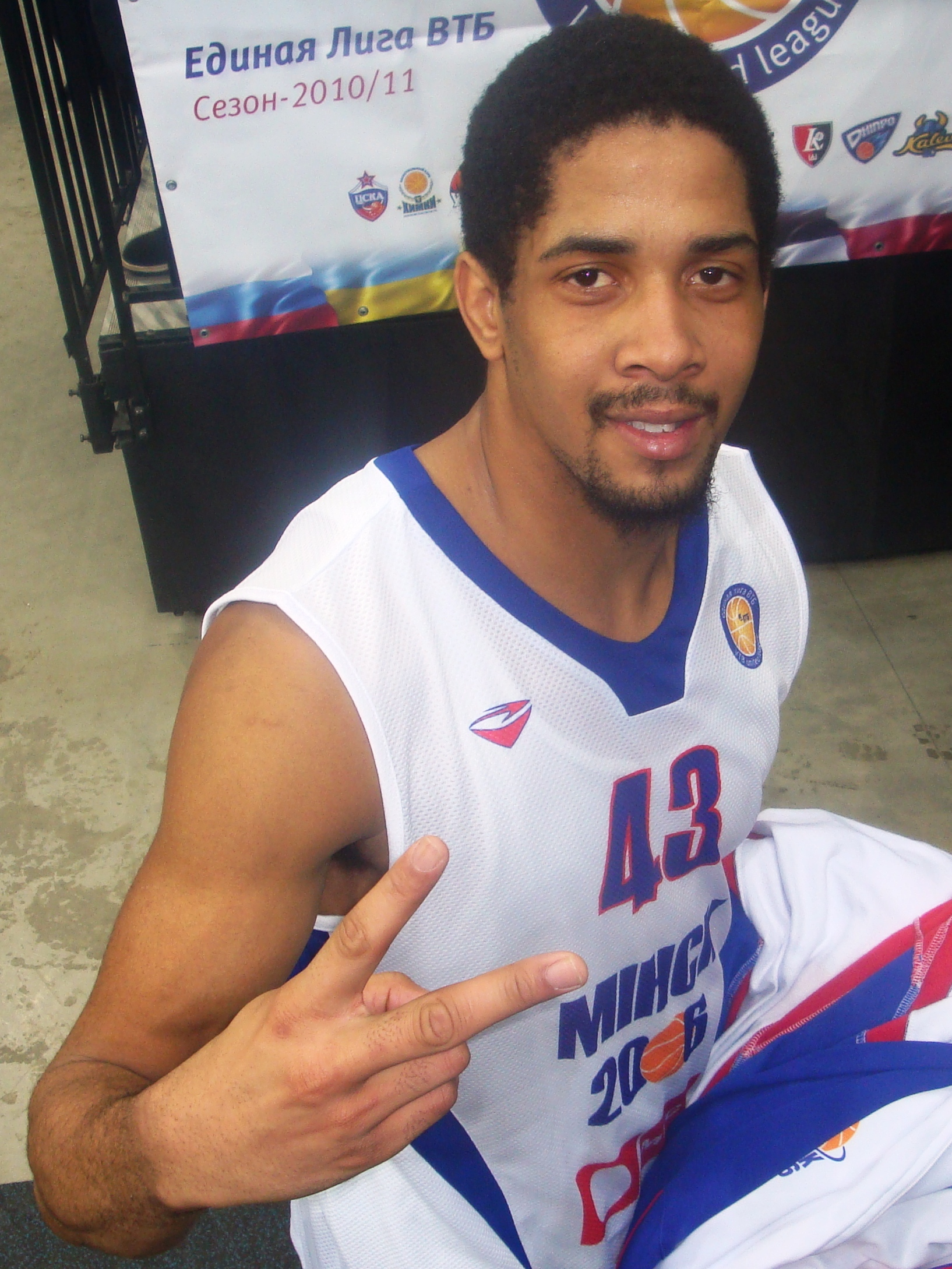
Tywain McKee, Coppin State, 2009

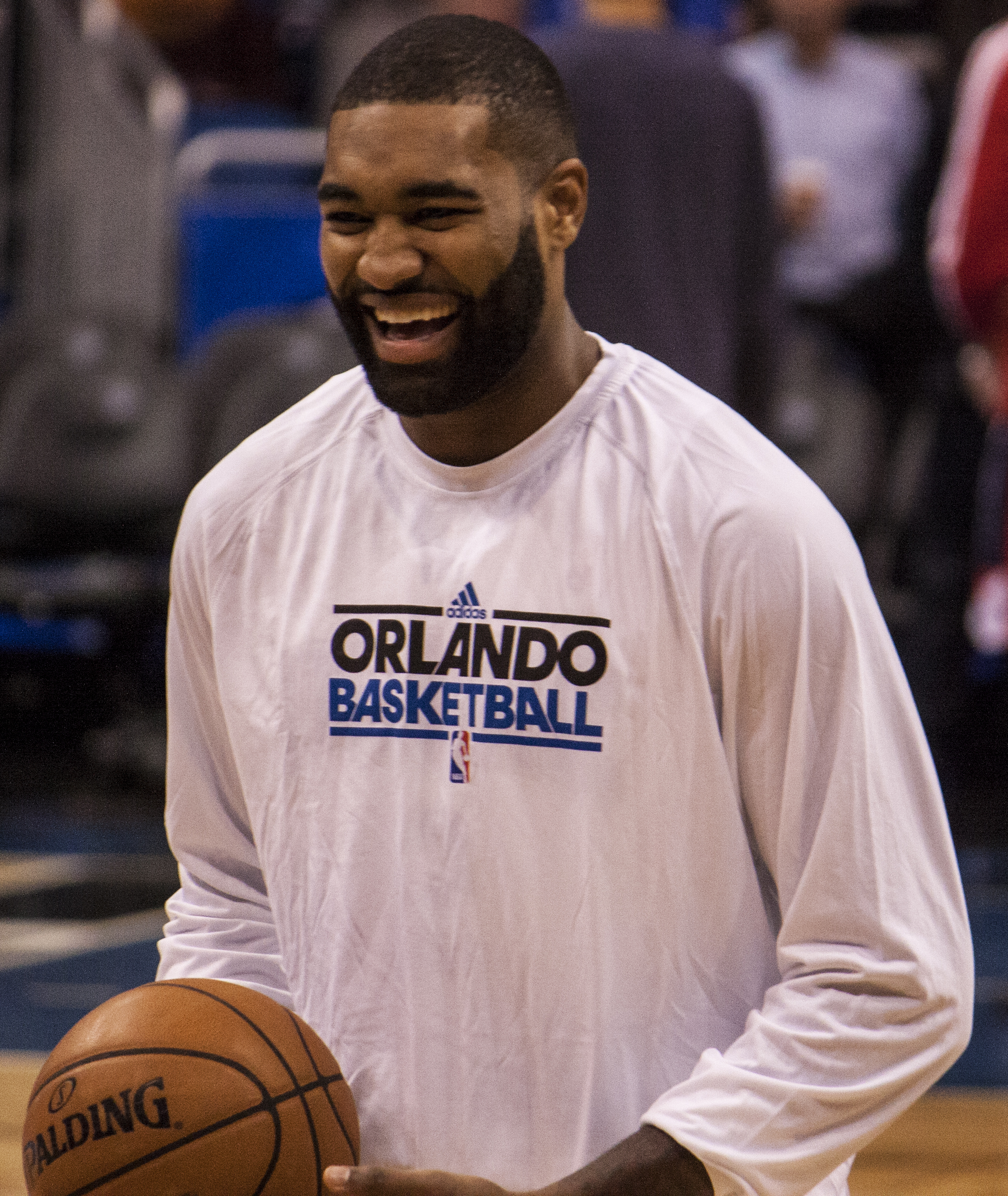
Kyle O'Quinn, Norfolk State, 2012

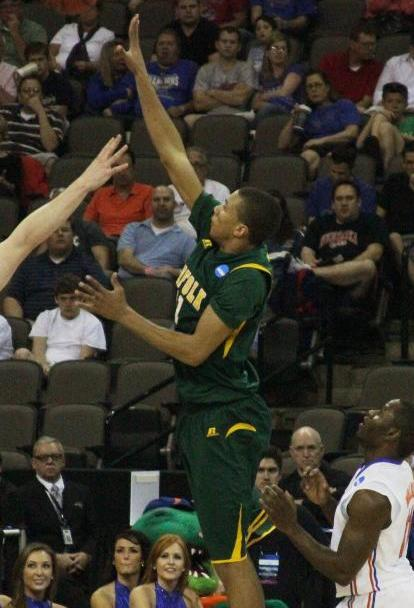
Pendarvis Williams, Norfolk State, 2013

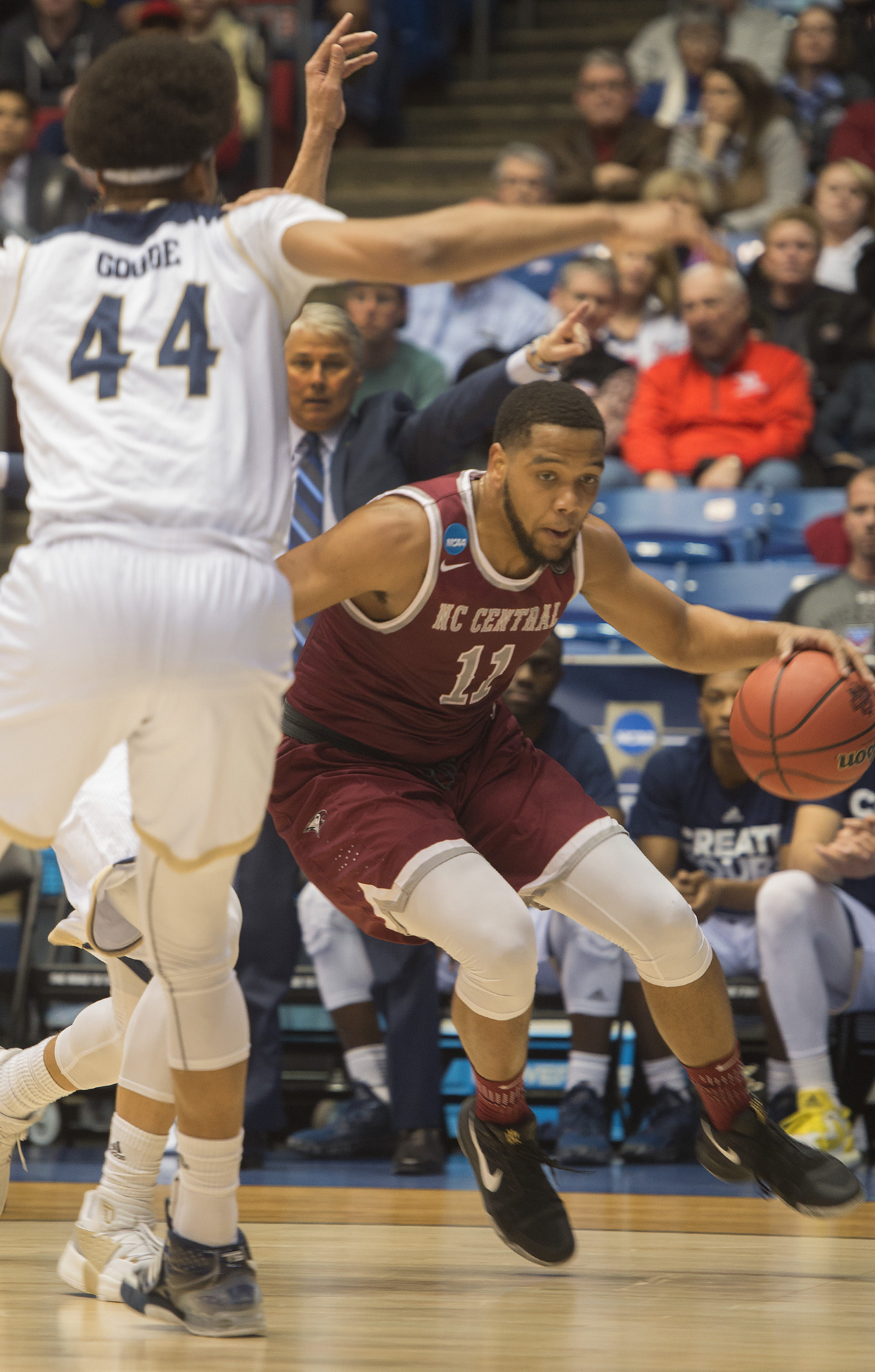
Patrick Cole, North Carolina Central, 2017

Season	Player	School	Position	Class	Reference
1971–72	Elmer Austin	North Carolina A&T	F	Senior	
1972–73	Marvin Webster	Morgan State	C	Sophomore	
1973–74	Marvin Webster (2)	Morgan State	C	Junior	
1974–75	Marvin Webster (3)	Morgan State	C	Senior	
1975–76	James Sparrow	North Carolina A&T	F	Sophomore	
1976–77	Eric Evans	Morgan State	C	Junior	
1977–78	Gerald Glover	Howard	F	Senior	
1978–79	Joe Brawner	North Carolina A&T	G	Junior	
1979–80	James Ratiff	Howard	PF	Sophomore	
1980–81	Larry Spriggs	Howard	SF	Senior	
1981–82	Joe Binion	North Carolina A&T	SF	Sophomore	
1982–83	Joe Binion (2)	North Carolina A&T	SF	Junior	
1983–84	Joe Binion (3)	North Carolina A&T	SF	Senior	
1984–85	Eric Boyd	North Carolina A&T	G	Junior	
1985–86	Don Hill	Bethune–Cookman	C	Senior	
1986–87	George Cale	North Carolina A&T	G	Senior	
1987–88	Claude Williams	North Carolina A&T	F	Senior	
1988–89	Tom Davis	Delaware State	PF	Sophomore	
1989–90	Larry Stewart	Coppin State	PF	Junior	
1990–91	Larry Stewart (2)	Coppin State	PF	Senior	
1991–92	Delon Turner	Florida A&M	PF	Junior	
1992–93	Jackie Robinson	South Carolina State	F	Senior	
1993–94	Stephen Stewart	Coppin State	SG / SF	Junior	
1994–95	Stephen Stewart (2)	Coppin State	SG / SF	Senior	
1995–96	Terquin Mott	Coppin State	PF	Junior	
1996–97	Roderick Blakney	South Carolina State	PG	Junior	
1997–98	Antoine Brockington	Coppin State	PG	Junior	
1998–99	Damian Woolfolk	Norfolk State	SG	Junior	
1999–00	Damian Woolfolk (2)	Norfolk State	SG	Senior	
2000–01	Tarvis Williams	Hampton	C	Junior	
2001–02	Tommy Adams	Hampton	PG / SG	Senior	
2002–03	Ron Williamson	Howard	SG	Senior	
2003–04	Thurman Zimmerman	South Carolina State	SG / SF	Sophomore	
2004–05	Chakowby Hicks	Norfolk State	PG	Senior	
2005–06	Jahsha Bluntt	Delaware State	SF	Junior	
2006–07	Jahsha Bluntt (2)	Delaware State	SF	Senior	
2007–08	Jamar Smith	Morgan State	SG	Senior	
2008–09	Tywain McKee	Coppin State	PG	Senior	
2009–10	Reggie Holmes	Morgan State	SG	Senior	
2010–11	C. J. Reed	Bethune–Cookman	PG	Junior	
2011–12	Kyle O'Quinn	Norfolk State	C	Senior	
2012–13	Pendarvis Williams	Norfolk State	PG	Junior	
2013–14	Jeremy Ingram	North Carolina Central	SG	Senior	
2014–15	Kendall Gray	Delaware State	C	Senior	
2015–16	James Daniel III	Howard	SG	Junior	
2016–17	Patrick Cole	North Carolina Central	PG	Senior	
2017–18	Brandon Tabb	Bethune–Cookman	SG / SF	Senior	
2018–19	R. J. Cole	Howard	PG	Sophomore	
2019–20	Jibri Blount	North Carolina Central	SF	Senior	
2020–21	Anthony Tarke	Coppin State	SG	Senior	
2021–22	Joe Bryant Jr.	Norfolk State	PG	Senior	
2022–23	Joe Bryant Jr. (2)	Norfolk State	PG	Graduate	
2023–24	Jamarii Thomas	Norfolk State	PG	Junior	
2024–25	Blake Harper	Howard	SG	Freshman	
2025–26	Bryce Harris	Howard	PG / SG	Graduate	

== Winners by school ==
In this table, "year joined" reflects the calendar year in which each school joined the conference, and years of departure for former members indicated in footnotes reflect the calendar year of departure. The "years" column reflects the calendar year of each award.

School (year joined)	Winners	Years
North Carolina A&T (1970) (Note: North Carolina A&T State University left for the Big South Conference in 2021.)	9	1972, 1976, 1979, 1982, 1983, 1984, 1985, 1987, 1988
Coppin State (1985)	8	1990, 1991, 1994, 1995, 1996, 1998, 2009, 2021
Howard (1970)	8	1978, 1980, 1981, 2003, 2016, 2019, 2025, 2026
Norfolk State (1997)	8	1999, 2000, 2005, 2012, 2013, 2022, 2023, 2024
Morgan State (1970) (Note: Morgan State University left the MEAC in 1979 but rejoined in 1984.)	6	1973, 1974, 1975, 1977, 2008, 2010
Delaware State (1970)	4	1989, 2006, 2007, 2015
Bethune–Cookman (1979) (Note: Bethune–Cookman University left for the Southwestern Athletic Conference in 2021.)	3	1986, 2011, 2018
North Carolina Central (1970) (Note: North Carolina Central University left the MEAC in 1979 but rejoined in 2010.)	3	2014, 2017, 2020
South Carolina State (1970)	3	1993, 1997, 2004
Hampton (1995)	2	2001, 2002
Florida A&M (1979) (Note: Florida A&M University left the MEAC in 1984, rejoined in 1986, and left again in 2021 for the Southwestern Athletic Conference.)	1	1992
Maryland Eastern Shore (1970) (Note: The University of Maryland Eastern Shore left the MEAC in 1979 but rejoined in 1981.)	0	—
Savannah State (2010) (Note: Savannah State University left for the NCAA Division II Southern Intercollegiate Athletic Conference in 2019.)	0	—
