= Joe Bryant Jr. =

American basketball player (born 2000)

No. 4 – BK Pardubice
- Position: Point guard / shooting guard
- League: NBL Czech Republic

Personal information
- Born: March 5, 2000 (age 26)
- Listed height: 6 ft 0 in (1.83 m)
- Listed weight: 220 lb (100 kg)

Career information
- High school: Lake Taylor (Norfolk, Virginia)
- College: Norfolk State (2018–2023)
- NBA draft: 2023: undrafted
- Playing career: 2023–present

Career history
- 2023–2024: Śląsk Wrocław
- 2024–2025: Psychiko
- 2025–present: BK Pardubice

Career highlights
- Czech NBL Player of the Year (2026); Czech NBL Import Player of the Year (2026); Czech NBL Guard of the Year (2026); All-Czech NBL First Team (2026); Greek Elite League MVP (2025); All-Greek Elite League Team (2025); Greek Elite League Top Scorer (2025); Greek Elite League steals leader (2025); 2× MEAC Player of the Year (2022, 2023); 2× First-team All-MEAC (2022, 2023); 2× MEAC tournament MVP (2021, 2022)

Jamonda Roshawn Bryant Jr. (born March 5, 2000) is an American professional basketball player for BK Pardubice of the NBL Czech Republic.

== High school career ==
Bryant attended Lake Taylor High School in Norfolk, Virginia, where one of his teammates was Dereon Seabron. Bryant was a two-time First Team All-Tidewater pick who led Lake Taylor to a state title as a senior. He committed to play college basketball at Norfolk State.

== College career ==
Bryant finished second on the team in scoring during his sophomore year with 12.0 points per game while also tallying 3.8 rebounds, 2.1 assists and 1.8 steals per game. He averaged 11.1 points and 4.2 rebounds per game as a junior. As a senior at Norfolk State, Bryant averaged 16.7 points, 5.1 rebounds and 3.2 assists per game. He shot 91.5 percent from the foul line, setting the Norfolk State record. Bryant was named Mid-Eastern Athletic Conference Player of the Year as well as conference tournament MVP. Following the season, he decided to return for his additional season of eligibility. As a redshirt senior in 2022–23, Bryant repeated as the MEAC's Player of the Year and MEAC Tournament MVP. He became the first player to win the award in back-to-back seasons since Delaware State's Jahsha Bluntt (2006, 2007).

== Professional career ==
Bryant did not get selected in the ensuing 2023 NBA draft. In August 2023, he signed his first professional basketball contract, joining the Polish Basketball League (PLK) for Śląsk Wrocław's second-division team. Two months later he was called up to Śląsk Wrocław's primary roster, making his debut in the EuroCup with two points and one rebound in eight minutes of action against Cluj-Napoca.

== Personal life ==
Bryant's mother Helen Holloway played basketball at Penn State. She was named Atlantic 10 Freshman of the Year and helped lead the Nittany Lions to four straight NCAA Tournaments. Bryant has a younger sister, Jada.
