= Pendarvis Williams =

American basketball player (born 1991)

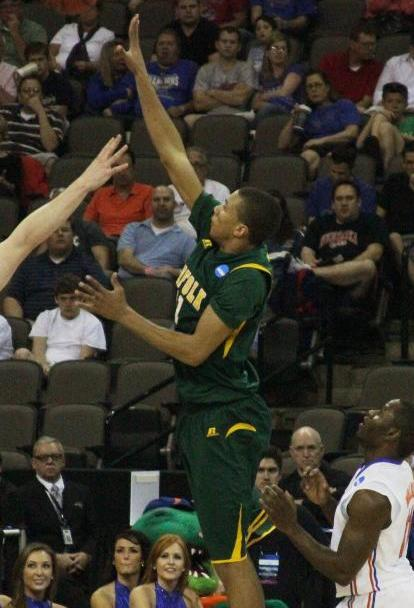

BCH Knights
- Position: Point guard / shooting guard
- League: The League

Personal information
- Born: November 13, 1991 (age 35)
- Listed height: 6 ft 6 in (1.98 m)
- Listed weight: 195 lb (88 kg)

Career information
- High school: Bodine (Philadelphia, Pennsylvania); Hun School (Princeton, New Jersey)
- College: Norfolk State (2010–2014)
- NBA draft: 2014: undrafted
- Playing career: 2014–present

Career history
- 2014–2015: Fortitudo Agrigento
- 2015–2016: Virtus Bologna
- 2016–2017: Maine Red Claws
- 2017–2018: Fortitudo Agrigento
- 2018–2019: BG Göttingen
- 2019–2020: JA Vichy-Clermont Métropole
- 2020–2021: Chieti 1974
- 2021–2022: JB Monferrato
- 2022–2024: Erdenet Miners
- 2024–present: BCH Knights

Career highlights
- The League winner (2023); The League MVP (2023); 2× Honorable mention All-American – AP (2013, 2014); MEAC Player of the Year (2013); First-team All-MEAC (2013); Second-team All-MEAC (2014)

Pendarvis Lafayette Akim Williams (born November 13, 1991) is an American basketball player for the BCH Knights of The League. He played college basketball for Norfolk State University, where in the 2012–13 season he was named an honorable mention All-American.

== Early life and college career ==
Williams, a 6'6" guard from Philadelphia, committed to Norfolk State where as a sophomore, he scored 20 points in the Spartans' 86–84 upset of number 2 seed Missouri in the 2012 NCAA Tournament. As a junior, after the loss of All-American Kyle O'Quinn, the Spartans were not expected to contend for the Mid-Eastern Athletic Conference championship. But Williams stepped up his performance, averaging 14.3 points and 4.3 rebounds per game. He led the Spartans to a 16–0 record and won conference Player of the Year honors. At the end of the season, Williams was named HBCU Player of the Year and an AP honorable mention All-American.

== Professional career ==
Following the close of his college career, Williams signed with Fortitudo Agrigento in Italy's second division. On July 13, 2015, he signed for Obiettivo Lavoro Bologna from the Serie A.

On October 31, 2016, Williams was acquired by the Maine Red Claws. On January 9, 2017, he was waived by Maine after 10 games. He spent the 2017–18 season with Fortitudo Agrigento of the Italian Serie A2. Williams signed with the German team BG Göttingen on July 2, 2018.

On August 6, 2019, he has signed with JA Vichy-Clermont Métropole Basket of the French Pro B.

On July 13, 2020, he has signed with Proger Chieti of the Italian Serie A2.
