= Stephen Stewart (basketball) =

American basketball player and coach (born c. 1972)

Coppin State Eagles
- Title: Assistant coach
- League: MEAC

Personal information
- Born: c. 1972 Philadelphia, Pennsylvania, U.S.
- Listed height: 6 ft 5 in (1.96 m)
- Listed weight: 233 lb (106 kg)

Career information
- High school: Parkway (Philadelphia, Pennsylvania)
- College: Coppin State (1992–1995)
- NBA draft: 1995: undrafted
- Playing career: 1995–2000
- Position: Shooting guard / small forward

Career history

Playing
- 1995–1997: Groningen
- 1998: Frankston Blues
- 2000: Lancaster Storm
- 2000: Frankston Blues

Coaching
- 2001–2004: Coppin State (assistant)
- 2004–2005: Albany (assistant)
- 2005–2006: Loyola (Maryland) (assistant)
- 2006–2010: Delaware (assistant)
- 2016–2017: Coppin State (assistant)
- 2018–2021: Delaware State (assistant)
- 2023–present: Coppin State (assistant)

Career highlights
- 2× MEAC Player of the Year (1994, 1995); 2× First Team All-MEAC (1994, 1995); MEAC Rookie of the Year (1993); MEAC tournament MVP (1993)

Stephen Stewart (born c. 1972) is an American former basketball player and coach. He is 6'5" and played the shooting guard and small forward positions.

Stewart grew up in Philadelphia, Pennsylvania, and attended Parkway Center City High School. After graduation, he enrolled at Coppin State University to play for head coach Fang Mitchell. He was forced to sit out his freshman season, however, due to the NCAA's Proposition 48. When his collegiate career began as a sophomore in 1992–93, he exploded onto the scene in the Mid-Eastern Athletic Conference (MEAC): Stewart led the Eagles to a 1993 MEAC tournament title, was named the MEAC Tournament Outstanding Performer and was also named the MEAC Rookie of the Year.

Throughout his three-year career, Stewart accumulated 1,393 points and 546 rebounds. In his final two seasons he was a First Team All-MEAC performer, and as a senior in 1994–95 he scored 19 points in a first-round victory over Saint Joseph's in the 1995 NIT. This win was Coppin State's first ever in a postseason tournament.

He never played professionally, but has spent time as an assistant coach for various colleges. Stephen Stewart was also later inducted into the MEAC Hall of Fame.

== Personal life ==
Stephen Stewart has two brothers who have played professional basketball. His older brother Larry was also a two-time MEAC Player of the Year; he then went on to play in the NBA as well as internationally. Stephen's younger brother, Lynard, played internationally.
