= Joe Brawner =

American basketball player

Personal information
- Listed height: 6 ft 0 in (1.83 m)

Career information
- High school: Spingarn (Washington, D.C.)
- College: North Carolina A&T (1977–1980); Winston-Salem State (1980–1981)
- NBA draft: 1981: undrafted
- Position: Point guard

Career highlights
- MEAC Player of the Year (1979); 2× First-team All-MEAC (1979, 1980)

Joe Brawner is an American former basketball player. He played college basketball for the North Carolina A&T Aggies and Winston-Salem State Rams. Brawner was the Mid-Eastern Athletic Conference Player of the Year as a sophomore with the Aggies in 1979.

== College basketball career ==
Brawner is from Washington, D.C., and attended Spingarn High School. He was recruited to play for the North Carolina A&T Aggies by assistant coach George Felton under head coach Gene Littles.

Littles credited Brawner's development at point guard throughout his freshman season as being the catalyst for the Aggies success. He totalled 103 assists and led the team with 64 steals during the 1977–78 season. The Aggies won the 1978 Mid-Eastern Athletic Conference (MEAC) tournament title.

Brawner was announced as the MEAC Player of the Year on February 22, 1979, after he had averaged 15.4 points per game during the 1978–79 season. The Aggies won a second consecutive MEAC tournament title in 1979.

Littles left the Aggies in 1979 to join the Utah Jazz coaching staff and was replaced by Don Corbett. Brawner and Harold Royster – the only other returning starter from the 1978–79 team – threatened to transfer to the East Carolina Panthers but were convinced to stay. Brawner averaged 20.6 points per game until he was suspended by Corbett in February 1980, and subsequently missed the last four games of the season. Brawner was selected to the All-MEAC first team in 1980. Corbett was "adamant" in a March 1980 interview that Brawner was no longer a part of the Aggies' future plans.

On September 24, 1980, it was announced that Brawner had left the Aggies and enrolled at Winston-Salem State University with intentions of playing basketball for the Rams. It was reported that he had a conflict with Corbett over a difference in desired playing styles. He made his debut for the Rams in December 1980.

== College baseball career ==
Brawner played on the Aggies baseball team as a shortstop. He joined the team late in 1978 due to his basketball commitments. Brawner returned in 1979; head coach Mel Groomes stated that "I think that after being named player of the year, Joe wants to prove he is an all-around athlete" and believed Brawner had the potential to play professional baseball.
