= Elmer Austin =

American basketball player (1949–2023)

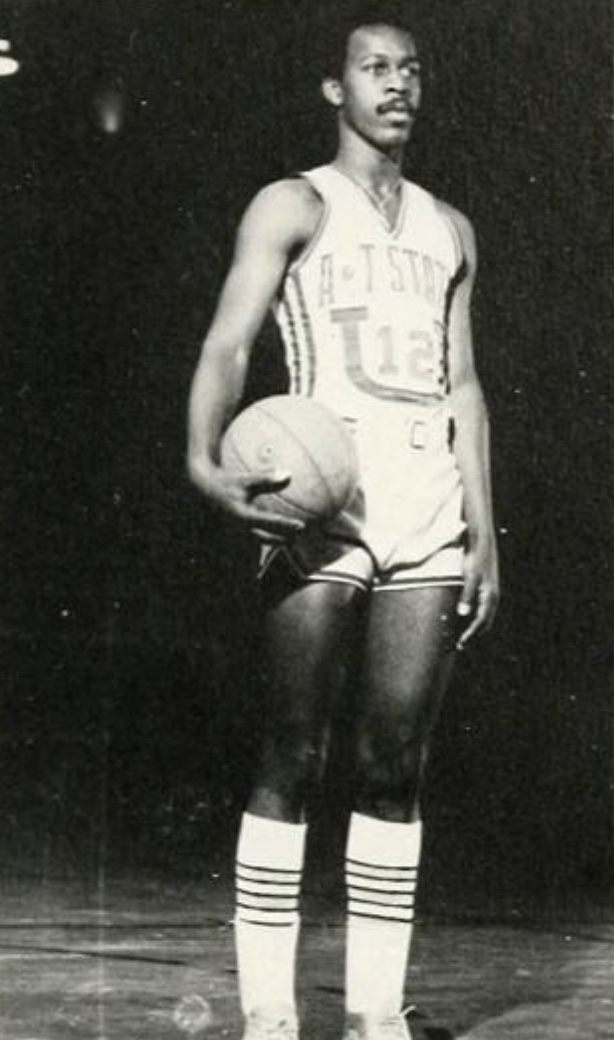
- Austin with the North Carolina A&T Aggies, c. 1972

Personal information
- Born: December 11, 1949 Greensboro, North Carolina, U.S.
- Died: December 28, 2023 (aged 74) Greensboro, North Carolina, U.S.
- Listed height: 6 ft 4 in (1.93 m)
- Listed weight: 190 lb (86 kg)

Career information
- High school: Dudley (Greensboro, North Carolina)
- College: North Carolina A&T (1968–1972)
- NBA draft: 1972: undrafted
- Position: Forward

Career highlights
- MEAC Player of the Year (1972); First-team All-MEAC (1972); All-CIAA (1971)

Elmer M. Austin Jr. (December 11, 1949 – December 28, 2023) was an American basketball player. He played college basketball for the North Carolina A&T Aggies and was the inaugural Mid-Eastern Athletic Conference Men's Basketball Player of the Year in 1972.

== Early life ==
Austin was born in Greensboro, North Carolina, to parents Elmer and Dorothy Austin. He attended James B. Dudley High School and initially pursued football until he was coerced by others into playing basketball. Austin averaged over 20 points per game during his prep career and received interest from 10 colleges. He was recruited by Cal Irvin of the North Carolina A&T Aggies and accepted a scholarship to attend North Carolina A&T State University. Austin graduated from Dudley in 1968.

== College career ==
Austin impressed Irvin during a preseason scrimmage against the Elon Phoenix and was moved into the starting line-up of the Aggies. He scored 24 points in his debut against the Akron Zips and remained in the starting line-up for his collegiate career.

Austin averaged a team-leading 19.1 points and 12.7 rebounds per game during his junior season. He earned All-Central Intercollegiate Athletic Association (CIAA) team honors.

The Aggies moved to the Mid-Eastern Athletic Conference (MEAC) for its debut season in 1971–72. Austin led the team to the first MEAC championship while averaging a team-high 21.3 points and 10.4 rebounds per game. He was selected as the inaugural MEAC Player of the Year.

Austin graduated with a degree in physical education. He tried out for professional clubs and the United States men's national basketball team after the 1972 NBA draft.

== Personal life and death ==
Austin had three children with his wife. He died in Greensboro, North Carolina on December 28, 2023, at the age of 74.
