= James Ratiff =

American basketball player (1958–2020)

Personal information
- Born: April 9, 1958 Washington, D.C., U.S.
- Died: January 4, 2020 (aged 61) Washington, D.C., U.S.
- Listed height: 6 ft 8 in (2.03 m)
- Listed weight: 215 lb (98 kg)

Career information
- High school: Eastern (Washington, D.C.)
- College: Tennessee (1977–1978); Howard (1979–1982)
- NBA draft: 1982: 8th round, 172nd overall pick
- Drafted by: Atlanta Hawks
- Position: Power forward

Career highlights
- MEAC Player of the Year (1980); 3× First-team All-MEAC (1980–1982); First-team Parade All-American (1977); McDonald's All-American (1977)
- Stats at Basketball Reference

James Ratiff (April 9, 1958 – January 4, 2020) was an American basketball player. A 6 ft 8 in (2.03 m) power forward from Washington, D.C., he was known for his high school and collegiate careers.

Ratiff attended Eastern High School in Washington, D.C. He was one of the most highly touted recruits in the nation. As a senior, Ratiff averaged 25 points, 17 rebounds, 6 assists, and 5 blocks per game. He was named to the inaugural McDonald's All-American team, which played in the 1977 Capital Classic. For a time, Virginia Tech thought they were going to sign him as a recruit. Ratiff ended up choosing Tennessee instead. In 1977–78, he spent his freshman season playing for the Volunteers and averaged 5.4 points and four rebounds per game. He decided to transfer after one year, citing an undesirable social climate in Knoxville as well as unrealistic expectations by the media for trying to make him out to be the next Bernard King, a former Tennessee great.

After sitting out one season due to transfer eligibility rules, Ratiff spent his final three collegiate years at his home city's Howard University. He garnered much success there: in all three seasons he was named an All-MEAC First Team selection, was a three-time All-MEAC tournament First Team pick, and in his sophomore year was named the MEAC Player of the Year.

After his collegiate career ended, Ratiff was selected in the 1982 NBA draft by the Atlanta Hawks (8th round, 172nd pick overall). He never played in the NBA, however.

Ratiff died on January 4, 2020, at age 61.
