= Anthony Tarke =

American basketball player

No. 3 – Kigali Tigers
- Position: Shooting guard / small forward
- League: Rwanda Basketball League

Personal information
- Born: May 27, 1997 (age 29) Washington, D.C., U.S.
- Listed height: 6 ft 6 in (1.98 m)
- Listed weight: 220 lb (100 kg)

Career information
- High school: Gaithersburg (Gaithersburg, Maryland); Coastal Academy (Neptune City, New Jersey)
- College: NJIT (2016–2018); UTEP (2019–2020); Coppin State (2020–2021)
- NBA draft: 2021: undrafted
- Playing career: 2021–present

Career history
- 2021–2022: Motor City Cruise
- 2023: Santa Cruz Warriors
- 2023: Maine Celtics
- 2023: Wisconsin Herd
- 2023: Ostioneros de Guaymas
- 2024: Wisconsin Herd
- 2024: Motor City Cruise
- 2024: Rayos de Hermosillo
- 2024: Freseros de Irapuato
- 2025: Long Island Nets
- 2025–2026: Ostioneros de Guaymas
- 2026–present: Kigali Tigers

Career highlights
- CIBACOPA champion (2024); MEAC Player of the Year (2021); MEAC Defensive Player of the Year (2021); First-team All-MEAC (2021); First-team All-Atlantic Sun (2018); Atlantic Sun All-Freshman Team (2017)
- Stats at NBA.com
- Stats at Basketball Reference

Anthony Shey Tarke (born May 27, 1997) is an American professional basketball player for the Kigali Tigers of the Rwanda Basketball League. He played college basketball player for the NJIT Highlanders, UTEP Miners and Coppin State Eagles. He was named the MEAC Player of the Year for the 2020–21 season.

== College career ==
Tarke attended Gaithersburg High School and was named to the All-Met team by the Washington Post. After a prep season at Coastal Academy in New Jersey, he committed to play college basketball at the New Jersey Institute of Technology (NJIT). He had a successful start to his career, averaging 9.9 points and 4.7 rebounds per game, earning ASUN Conference all-freshman team honors. He followed this up by moving full time into the Highlanders' starting lineup, improving his averages to 15.7 points and 6.2 rebounds per game and was named to the first-team All-Atlantic Sun. Following this season, Tarke decided to transfer to a program that would provide a higher level of competition, choosing the University of Texas at El Paso (UTEP). After sitting out the 2018–19 season, he played one season for the Miners, but found playing time inconsistent. He chose to enter the transfer portal again, this time as an immediately-eligible graduate transfer.

Tarke chose Coppin State and head coach Juan Dixon for his final year of eligibility. On the season, he averaged 16.4 points, 8.4 rebounds and 3.7 assists per game for the Eagles, who went on to win a share of the MEAC North division regular season title. At the close of the season, Tarke was named the MEAC Player of the Year and Defensive Player of the Year.

== Professional career ==
=== Motor City Cruise (2021–2022) ===
After going undrafted in the 2021 NBA draft, Tarke signed a training camp contract with the Detroit Pistons, but was waived on September 27. Tarke was added to their G League affiliate, the Motor City Cruise in October 2021.

=== Santa Cruz Warriors (2023) ===
On February 15, 2023, Tarke was acquired by the Santa Cruz Warriors. On February 27, 2023, Tarke was waived.

=== Maine Celtics (2023) ===
On March 8, 2023, Tarke was acquired by the Maine Celtics. On March 14, 2023, Tarke was waived before appearing in a game for them.

=== Wisconsin Herd (2023) ===
On March 14, 2023, Tarke was acquired by the Wisconsin Herd.

=== Ostioneros de Guaymas (2023) ===
On April 29, 2023, Tarke signed with the Ostioneros de Guaymas of the CIBACOPA, making his debut that night.

=== Return to Wisconsin (2024) ===
On October 30, 2023, Tarke rejoined the Wisconsin Herd, but was waived on November 10. On February 9, 2024, he rejoined the Herd and on March 1, he was waived by the Herd.

=== Return to Motor City (2024) ===
On March 7, 2024, Tarke rejoined the Motor City Cruise.

=== Rayos de Hernosillo (2024) ===
On April 23, 2024, Tarke signed with the Rayos de Hermosillo of the Circuito de Baloncesto de la Costa del Pacífico.

=== Freseros de Irapuato (2024) ===
On July 24, 2024, Tarke signed with the Freseros de Irapuato of the Liga Nacional de Baloncesto Profesional.

On October 29, 2024, Tarke rejoined the Motor City Cruise but was waived on November 6.
