= Jamarii Thomas =

American basketball player (born 2002)

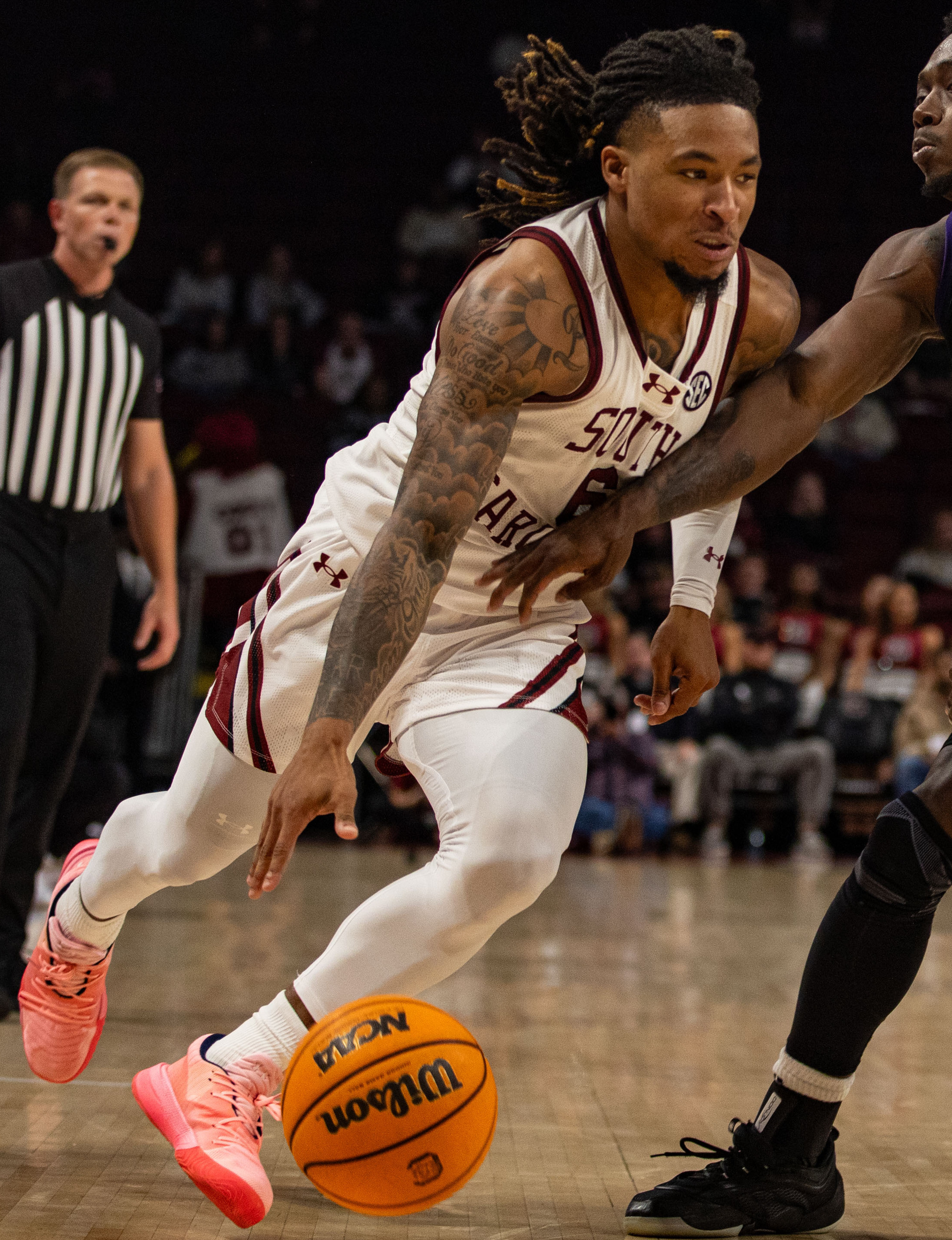
- Thomas with South Carolina in 2024

No. 0 – Kortrijk Spurs
- Position: Shooting guard / point guard
- League: BNXT League

Personal information
- Born: June 26, 2002 (age 24) Greensboro, North Carolina, U.S.
- Listed height: 5 ft 11 in (1.80 m)
- Listed weight: 190 lb (86 kg)

Career information
- High school: The Burlington School (Burlington, North Carolina)
- College: UNC Wilmington (2021–2023); Norfolk State (2023–2024); South Carolina (2024–2025)
- NBA draft: 2025: undrafted
- Playing career: 2025–present

Career history
- 2025–2026: Apollon Limassol B.C.
- 2026: MKS Dąbrowa Górnicza
- 2026–present: Kortrijk Spurs

Career highlights
- MEAC Player of the Year (2024); First-team All-MEAC (2024); MEAC Newcomer of the Year (2024); MEAC All-Defensive team (2024)

Jamarii D'Aje Johnson Thomas (born June 26, 2002) is an American professional basketball player for Kortrijk Spurs of the BNXT League. He played college basketball for the South Carolina Gamecocks, Norfolk State Spartans and UNC Wilmington Seahawks.

== College career ==
After two seasons at UNC Wilmington where he averaged 13.8 minutes and 4.8 points per game, Thomas entered the transfer portal in search of a team where he would play a larger role, ultimately landing at Norfolk State. In his single season with the Spartans, Thomas averaged 16.9 points and 2.1 steals per game. At the close of the season he was named the Mid-Eastern Athletic Conference Player of the Year and Newcomer of the Year.

Following the 2023–24 season, Thomas opted to enter the transfer portal a second time. He initially committed to VCU. However, five days later he switched his commitment to South Carolina. Thomas averaged 13.2 points, 3.0 assists, 2.9 rebounds, and 1.3 steals per game. He entered the transfer portal after the season, however he had no eligibility remaining.

== Professional career ==
On September 25, 2025, Thomas signed with Apollon Limassol B.C. of the Cypriot Basketball League.

On January 29, 2026, he signed with MKS Dąbrowa Górnicza of the Polish Basketball League (PLK).

On June 19, 2026, he signed with Kortrijk Spurs of the BNXT League.
