= George Cale =

American basketball player (born 1965)

Personal information
- Born: December 1965 (age 60)
- Listed height: 6 ft 6 in (1.98 m)
- Listed weight: 185 lb (84 kg)

Career information
- High school: Middletown (Middletown, Delaware)
- College: North Carolina A&T (1983–1987)
- NBA draft: 1987: undrafted
- Position: Shooting guard

Career highlights
- MEAC Player of the Year (1987); 2× First-team All-MEAC (1986, 1987)

George A. Cale Jr. (born December 1965) is an American law enforcement officer and former basketball player.

Cale grew up in Middletown, Delaware and attended Middletown High School. As a junior, he led Delaware in scoring with 25.7 points as well as 12.8 rebounds per game, despite being double teamed most games. Cale scored a career-high 50 points against Harford Vo-Tech. Cale repeated as the Delaware scoring champion as a senior, averaging 28.5 points per game. He scored in double figures in his last 42 games in a row. Cale was a First Team All-State selection by The Morning News.

Cale played four seasons at North Carolina A&T and was twice named to the First Team All-MEAC. As a sophomore, he was second on the team in scoring with 13.0 points per game. Cale became the team's leading scorer as a junior, averaging 14.8 points as well as 5.3 rebounds per game. As a senior, Cale led the team with 15.9 points per game while shooting 52 percent from the field. He was named MEAC Player of the Year in 1987. Cale graduated with a business degree.

After graduating, Cale tried out for the Boston Celtics. He began working in banking, first in Syracuse and then with Delaware Trust Company and Discover Card. Cale became a patrol officer in the New Castle County police force in June 1994 and was named the top recruit in his Police Academy class. He served as a mounted officer and received a Commendation of Merit and a KIWANIS Officer of the Quarter Award. Cale retired from the police department in January 2014. In 2015, he began working for the Capitol Police. By 2020, Cale had retired from the force and worked at the court house.

Cale is married to Shevena, a school administrator in the Christiana School District. They have a son, Myles, and daughter, Amber. His son plays basketball for Seton Hall, while his daughter played for Lincoln University.
