= Delon Turner =

American basketball player (born 1971)

Personal information
- Born: July 16, 1971 (age 55) Miami, Florida, U.S.
- Listed height: 6 ft 5 in (1.96 m)

Career information
- High school: Miami Carol City (Miami, Florida)
- College: Florida A&M (1989–1993)
- NBA draft: 1993: undrafted
- Position: Power forward

Career history
- 1993: Palm Beach Stingrays
- 1994–1995: Lappeenrannan NMKY

Career highlights
- MEAC Player of the Year (1992); First-team All-MEAC (1992, 1993); Second-team All-MEAC (1991)

Delon Shawntta Turner (born July 16, 1971) is an American former professional basketball player. He played college basketball for the Florida A&M Rattlers and was selected as the Mid-Eastern Athletic Conference (MEAC) Player of the Year in 1992. Turner played professionally in the United States Basketball League (USBL) and overseas in Finland, Israel, Spain, Argentina and South Korea.

== Early life ==
Turner is a native of Miami, Florida. He attended Miami Carol City Senior High School and won a state championship with the basketball team during his senior season. Turner was recruited by teams including the Colorado Buffaloes and Miami Hurricanes but their offers were rescinded due to his academics. Turner was then persuaded to join the Florida A&M Rattlers through the recruitment of head coach Willie Booker with the assistance of Turner's principal Dr. Hunt who was an alumnus.

== College career ==
Turner recovered from a meniscus tear prior to the start of his freshman season with the Florida A&M Rattlers. He scored 30 points in his debut game against the Bethune–Cookman Wildcats.

Turner led the Rattlers in rebounding with 10.2 per game as a sophomore during the 1990–91 season. He helped the Rattlers won their first Mid-Eastern Athletic Conference (MEAC) championship in 1991.

Turner led the Rattlers in scoring and rebounding during his junior and senior years. He was selected as the MEAC Player of the Year in 1992 and named to the All-MEAC first-team in 1992 and 1993.

Turner left the Rattlers as their all-time NCAA Division I leading scorer with 1,795 points and rebounder with 974 rebounds. He was nicknamed "Baby Barkley" by commentator Dick Vitale due to his similarity to Charles Barkley. Turner was inducted into the FAMU Sports Hall of Fame in 2020.

== Professional career ==
Turner played 25 games for the Palm Beach Stingrays of the United States Basketball League (USBL) during the 1993 season. He attended training camp with the Denver Nuggets of the National Basketball Association (NBA) in 1993.

On July 28, 1994, Turner signed with Lappeenrannan NMKY of the Korisliiga. He averaged 27.2 points and 12.0 rebounds in 33 games played.

Turner played two seasons in Israel, four seasons in Spain, three seasons in Argentina and two seasons in South Korea. He decided to retire after he was slowed by multiple knee operations.

== Post-playing career ==
Turner became an entrepreneur after his basketball career. He started as a Quiznos franchisee and then transitioned to Foot Locker stores. Turner operated seven stores across the United States with the partnership of his former collegiate teammate Kelvin Daniels. He downsized his assets in 2010 as a result of the Great Recession.

Turner returned to Florida A&M University in 2011 to complete his degree which had been left incomplete when he departed for his professional basketball career. On April 28, 2012, he received his bachelor's degree in agribusiness.

Turner worked on Wall Street and in wealth management. He is the founder of a venture capital firm, 7even Hills.

== Personal life ==
Turner's son, Dallas, is a professional football player.
