= Patrick Cole =

American basketball player

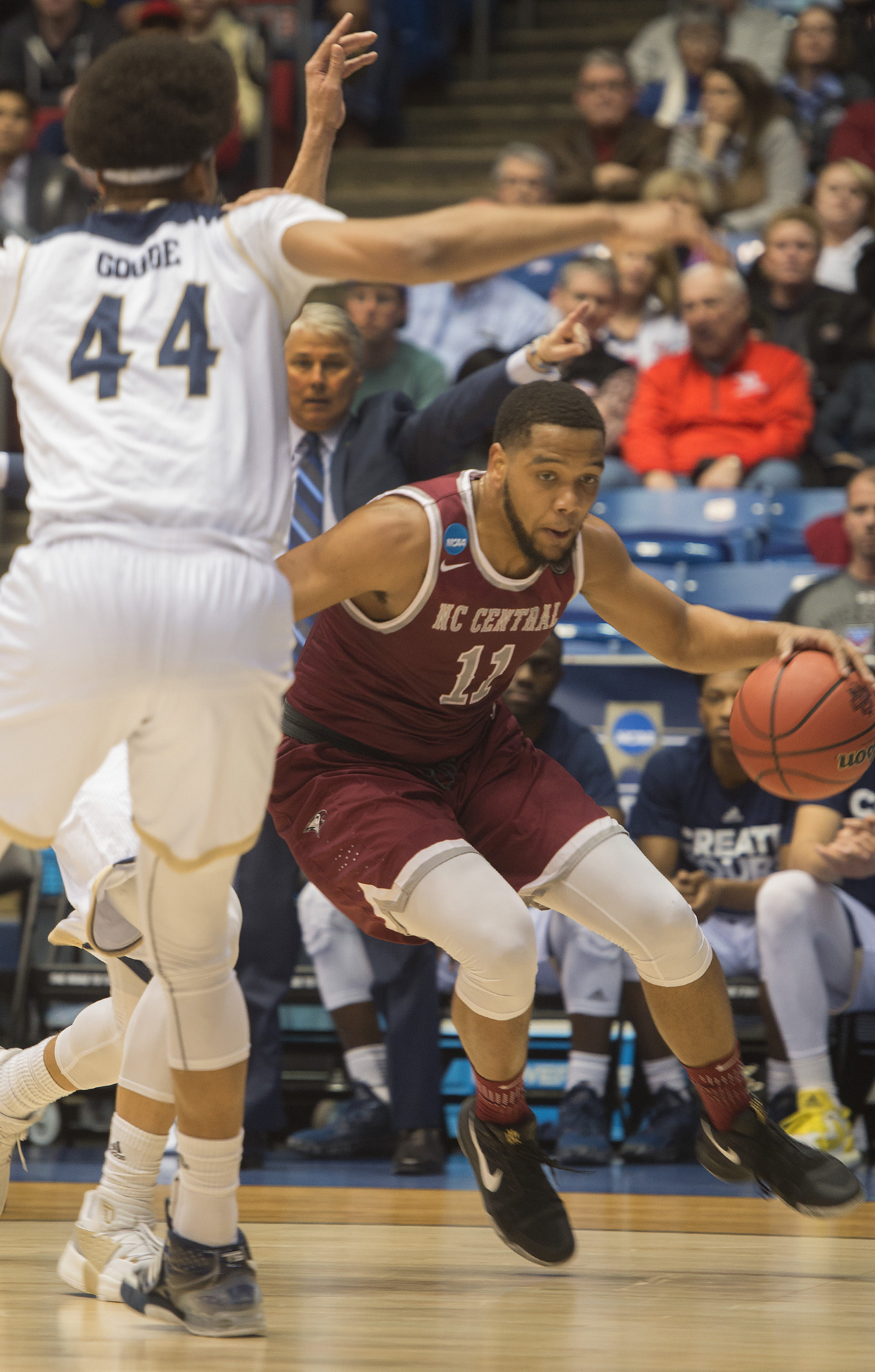
- Cole dribbles past UC Davis’s Garrison Goode in the 2017 NCAA Tournament

Personal information
- Born: May 19, 1993 (age 33)
- Listed height: 6 ft 5 in (1.96 m)
- Listed weight: 210 lb (95 kg)

Career information
- High school: Central (Newark, New Jersey)
- College: Coppin State (2012–2013); Siena (2014–2015); North Carolina Central (2015–2017)
- NBA draft: 2017: undrafted
- Playing career: 2017–2018
- Position: Shooting guard
- Number: 10

Career history
- 2017: Sigal Prishtina
- 2018: KK Student Mostar

Career highlights
- MEAC Player of the Year (2017); AP honorable mention All-American (2017)

Patrick Cole (born May 19, 1993) is an American former professional basketball player. He competed in college for Coppin State, Siena, and North Carolina Central.

== Early life ==
Cole is the son of Patrick Brinson and Denise Cole and grew up in Newark, New Jersey. As a child, his favorite sport was soccer, although he developed an interest in basketball later. In his senior year at Newark Central High School, he led the team to the Group II state championship. Cole averaged 11.2 points per game and received All-Essex County honors.

== College career ==
Cole began his college career at Coppin State, where he averaged 10.3 points, 2.8 rebounds and 2.2 assists per game. He was named to the MEAC All-Rookie team but opted to transfer to Siena. He only played seven games for the Saints and averaged 8.4 points, 2.7 rebounds and 1.9 assists per game. On December 19, 2014, Siena Coach Jimmy Patsos announced that Cole was suspended from the team indefinitely.

Cole transferred again, to North Carolina Central and finished second on the team in scoring as a junior with a 14.4 points per game average, to go along with 4.5 rebounds and 3.2 assists per game. In his senior year, Cole averaged 19.6 points and 5.8 assists per game. He recorded North Carolina Central's first triple-double in the Division I era, with 14 points, 12 rebounds and 10 assists against Jackson State. He had a season-high 32 points in a win over Northern Kentucky. He was named MEAC Player of the Year on March 3, 2017. Cole earned most valuable player honors of the 2017 MEAC men's basketball tournament after contributing 18 points and eight rebounds in a victory over Norfolk State in the championship game.

== Professional career ==
In July 2017, Cole signed with Sigal Prishtina of the Kosovo Basketball Superleague. He appeared in two BCL games in September 2017.

In January 2018, Cole joined KK Student Mostar of the Basketball Championship of Bosnia and Herzegovina. In six games, he averaged 6.3 points, 2.5 rebounds and 1.3 assists per game.
