= Chakowby Hicks =

American basketball player

Personal information
- Listed height: 6 ft 4 in (1.93 m)
- Listed weight: 190 lb (86 kg)

Career information
- High school: Spingarn (Washington, D.C.)
- College: Norfolk State (2001–2005)
- NBA draft: 2005: undrafted
- Position: Guard

Career highlights
- MEAC Player of the Year (2005); 2× First-team All-MEAC (2004, 2005); MEAC All-Rookie team (2002)

Chakowby Hicks is an American former basketball player. He played college basketball for the Norfolk State Spartans from 2001 to 2005. Hicks was selected as the Mid-Eastern Athletic Conference (MEAC) Player of the Year in 2005.

== Basketball career ==
Hicks attended Spingarn High School in Washington, D.C. and played on the basketball team. During his senior year in 2000, he helped the school win its first District-wide championship since 1985. Hicks dedicated the win to his friend and teammate, Nathaniel Holmes, who was killed in November 1999.

Hicks committed to play college basketball for the Norfolk State Spartans. He was selected to the Mid-Eastern Athletic Conference (MEAC) All-Rookie team in 2002. During his senior season in 2004–05, Hicks led the Spartans in scoring (14.5), assists (3.9) and steals (3.5); he ranked second in NCAA Division I in steals. On March 9, 2005, he was named as the MEAC Player of the Year. Hicks was the second player in Spartans history to be a two-time All-MEAC first-team selection. His 276 career steals rank second in Spartans program history.

Hicks was chosen to the MEAC 50th Anniversary Men's Basketball Team in 2021.
