= Damian Woolfolk =

American basketball player (born 1970)

Personal information
- Born: 1970s
- Listed height: 6 ft 5 in (1.96 m)
- Listed weight: 210 lb (95 kg)

Career information
- High school: Caroline (Milford, Virginia)
- College: Norfolk State (1997–2000)
- NBA draft: 2000: undrafted
- Position: Shooting guard

Career history
- 2000–2001: Tampa Bay ThunderDawgs

Career highlights
- 2× MEAC Player of the Year (1999, 2000); 2× First-team All-MEAC (1999, 2000)

Damian Woolfolk is an American basketball player who is best known for his college career at Norfolk State University between 1997–98 and 1999–2000. A native of the Ruther Glen, Virginia, the 6'5", 210-pound shooting guard was the two-time Mid-Eastern Athletic Conference Men's Basketball Player of the Year, first as a junior in 1998–99 and again as a senior the following year. He scored 1,711 career points while playing for the Spartans, which through 2009–10 was the 10th highest total in school history. He played in 82 career games for a per-game average of 20.8 points per game. His 23.5 points per game average as a junior led the MEAC and was also the fifth-highest in all of NCAA Division I, while his 20.9 per game average as a senior led the MEAC once again.

After college, Woolfolk had a stint playing for the short-lived Tampa Bay ThunderDawgs in the American Basketball Association, whose franchise lasted for only the 2000–01 season.
