= Dallas Turner =

American football player (born 2003)

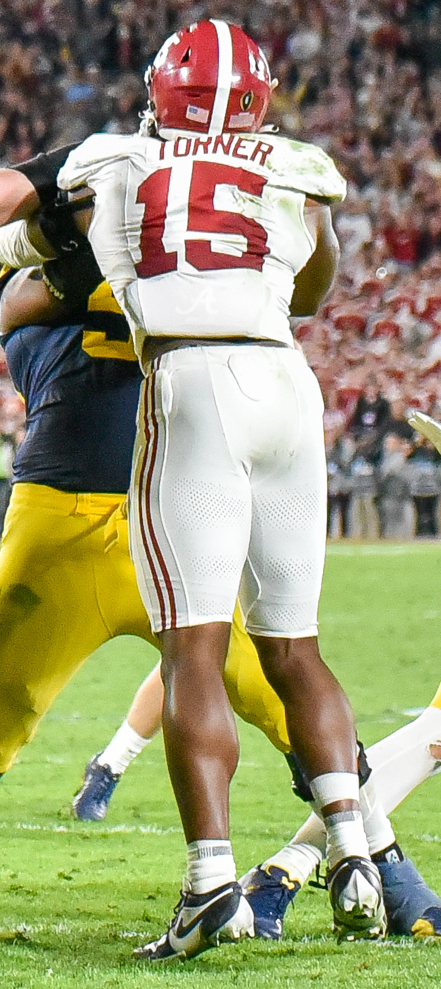
- Turner with the Alabama Crimson Tide in 2024

No. 15 – Minnesota Vikings
- Position: Outside linebacker
- Roster status: Active

Personal information
- Born: February 2, 2003 (age 23); Fort Lauderdale, Florida, U.S.
- Listed height: 6 ft 3 in (1.91 m)
- Listed weight: 247 lb (112 kg)

Career information
- High school: St. Thomas Aquinas (Fort Lauderdale)
- College: Alabama (2021–2023)
- NFL draft: 2024: 1st round, 17th overall pick

Career history
- Minnesota Vikings (2024–present)

Awards and highlights
- Consensus All-American (2023); SEC Co-Defensive Player of the Year (2023)

Career NFL statistics as of Week 10, 2026
- Tackles: 113
- Sacks: 19.0
- Forced fumbles: 6
- Fumble recoveries: 1
- Pass deflections: 7
- Interceptions: 1
- Stats at Pro Football Reference

Dallas Turner (born February 2, 2003) is an American professional football outside linebacker for the Minnesota Vikings of the National Football League (NFL). He played college football for the Alabama Crimson Tide, where he was named the SEC Co-Defensive Player of the Year in 2023. Turner was selected by the Vikings in the first round of the 2024 NFL draft.

== Early life ==
Turner's father, Delon, is a former professional basketball player who became a venture capitalist. He grew up in Fort Lauderdale, Florida, and initially attended American Heritage School in Plantation, Florida. As a junior, he was named the area Defensive Player of the Year by the Sun-Sentinel after finishing the season with 74 tackles, 18 tackles for loss, 15 sacks, and 3 forced fumbles. After the season Turner transferred to St. Thomas Aquinas High School in Fort Lauderdale, Florida. Turner was rated a five-star recruit and committed to play college football at Alabama entering his senior season after considering offers from Florida, Georgia, Michigan, and Oklahoma. He had 34 tackles, 12 tackles for loss, and 13 sacks as a senior.

== College career ==
Turner began his freshman season as part of Alabama's defensive pass rush rotation before starting his first career game against Texas A&M. He was named to the Southeastern Conference (SEC) All-Freshman team. He tied for the lead in the SEC in sacks with ten in 2023. In a loss to Tennessee in the 2022 season, he had an 11-yard fumble recovery for a touchdown. He was a Consensus All-American in 2023. He earned SEC Defensive Player of the Year. Turner declared for the 2024 NFL draft following Alabama's loss in the 2024 Rose Bowl.

== Professional career ==
Pre-draft measurables
Height	Weight	Arm length	Hand span	Wingspan	40-yard dash	10-yard split	20-yard split	Vertical jump	Broad jump	Bench press
6 ft 2 3/4 in (1.90 m)	247 lb (112 kg)	34 3/8 in (0.87 m)	9 7/8 in (0.25 m)	6 ft 11 in (2.11 m)	4.46 s	1.54 s	2.65 s	40.5 in (1.03 m)	10 ft 7 in (3.23 m)	20 reps
All values from NFL Combine/Pro Day

Turner was selected by the Minnesota Vikings in the first round with the 17th overall pick in the 2024 NFL draft.

Turner had a sack in his NFL debut in week 1 against the Giants. In week 16 against the Seattle Seahawks, Turner picked off Geno Smith to record his first career interception en route to a 27–24 win. As a rookie, he finished with three sacks, 20 tackles, one interception, and one pass defended.

In the 2025 season, Turner improved as a pass rusher with eight sacks on the season and finished the season strong with 6.5 coming in the final eight games. His four strip-sacks tied Josh Sweat for the league lead.

In week 10 of the 2026 NFL season against the Green Bay Packers, Turner had an outstanding game recording two pass deflections, one fumble recovery and one sack over Jordan Love, helping the Vikings to win 30–10 and move to a 7–2 record in the season.

== NFL career statistics ==
Legend
**Bold**	Career high

=== Regular season ===
Year	Team	Games		Tackles					Fumbles			Interceptions					
Year	Team	GP	GS	Cmb	Solo	Ast	Sck	TFL	FF	FR	Yds	Int	Yds	Avg	Lng	TD	PD
2024	MIN	16	0	20	12	8	3.0	3	0	0	0	**1**	**4**	**4.0**	**4**	0	1
2025	MIN	17	10	**66**	**29**	**37**	**8.0**	**11**	**4**	0	0	0	0	0.0	0	0	**3**
Career		33	10	86	41	45	11.0	14	4	0	0	1	4	4.0	4	0	4

=== Postseason ===
Year	Team	Games		Tackles					Fumbles			Interceptions					
Year	Team	GP	GS	Cmb	Solo	Ast	Sck	TFL	FF	FR	Yds	Int	Yds	Avg	Lng	TD	PD
2024	MIN	1	0	1	0	1	0.0	0	0	0	0	0	0	0.0	0	0	0
Career		1	0	1	0	1	0.0	0	0	0	0	0	0	0.0	0	0	0

== Personal life ==
After a training camp practice in 2025, Turner revealed that his favorite type of cheese is mozzarella.
