= Lynard Stewart =

American basketball player and coach

Personal information
- Born: May 12, 1976 (age 50) Philadelphia, Pennsylvania, U.S.
- Listed height: 6 ft 8 in (2.03 m)
- Listed weight: 228 lb (103 kg)

Career information
- High school: Simon Gratz (Philadelphia, Pennsylvania)
- College: Temple (1994–1998)
- NBA draft: 1998: undrafted
- Playing career: 1998–2010
- Position: Power forward
- Number: 15

Career history

Playing
- 1998–1999: Beijing Ducks
- 2000: Nový Jičín
- 2000: Philadelphia Force
- 2000: Maccabi Karmiel
- 2001: Siouxland Bombers
- 2001: Potros de la Villa Francisca
- 2001–2004: Sheffield Sharks
- 2004–2006: London Towers
- 2006–2007: Euphony Bree
- 2007–2010: Newcastle Eagles

Coaching
- 2011–2015: William Penn Charter
- 2015–present: Simon Gratz HS

Lynard Stewart (born May 12, 1976) is an American former professional basketball player and current high school basketball coach.

== Playing career ==
The 6'8" forward/center played at Temple University, where he graduated in 1998, before signing a professional contract in China with the Beijing Ducks. The following season saw him move to Europe to play in the Czech Republic with Mlekarna Kunin and then moved back to his hometown to play for Philadelphia Force in 2000. Further ventures with Maccabi Karmiel (Israel), Siouxland Bombers, and Potros de Villa Francisca (Dominican Republic) followed before he eventually settled with Sheffield Sharks in 2001. After three seasons with the Sharks, he moved south to play for their title-rivals in the British Basketball League, London Towers, where he spent two more seasons. After a one-season hiatus in Belgium, with Euphony Bree, Stewart moved back to England in 2007, to sign for league champions Newcastle Eagles.

== Coaching career ==
In 2011, Stewart became the head boys' basketball coach at William Penn Charter School in Philadelphia, Pennsylvania. Beginning in 2015, he took over the basketball team at Simon Gratz High School (his alma mater), which also located in Philadelphia.

== Personal ==
Stewart is the younger brother of former NBA player Larry Stewart, and college basketball assistant coach Stephen Stewart. He played high school basketball at Simon Gratz High School in Philadelphia, where he was a teammate of Rasheed Wallace. In his first season at Gratz in 2015-16, Stewart led the Bulldogs into the second round of the PIAA Class AAAA playoffs after defeating powerhouse Lower Merion in the first round.
