= Tywain McKee =

American basketball player (born 1986)

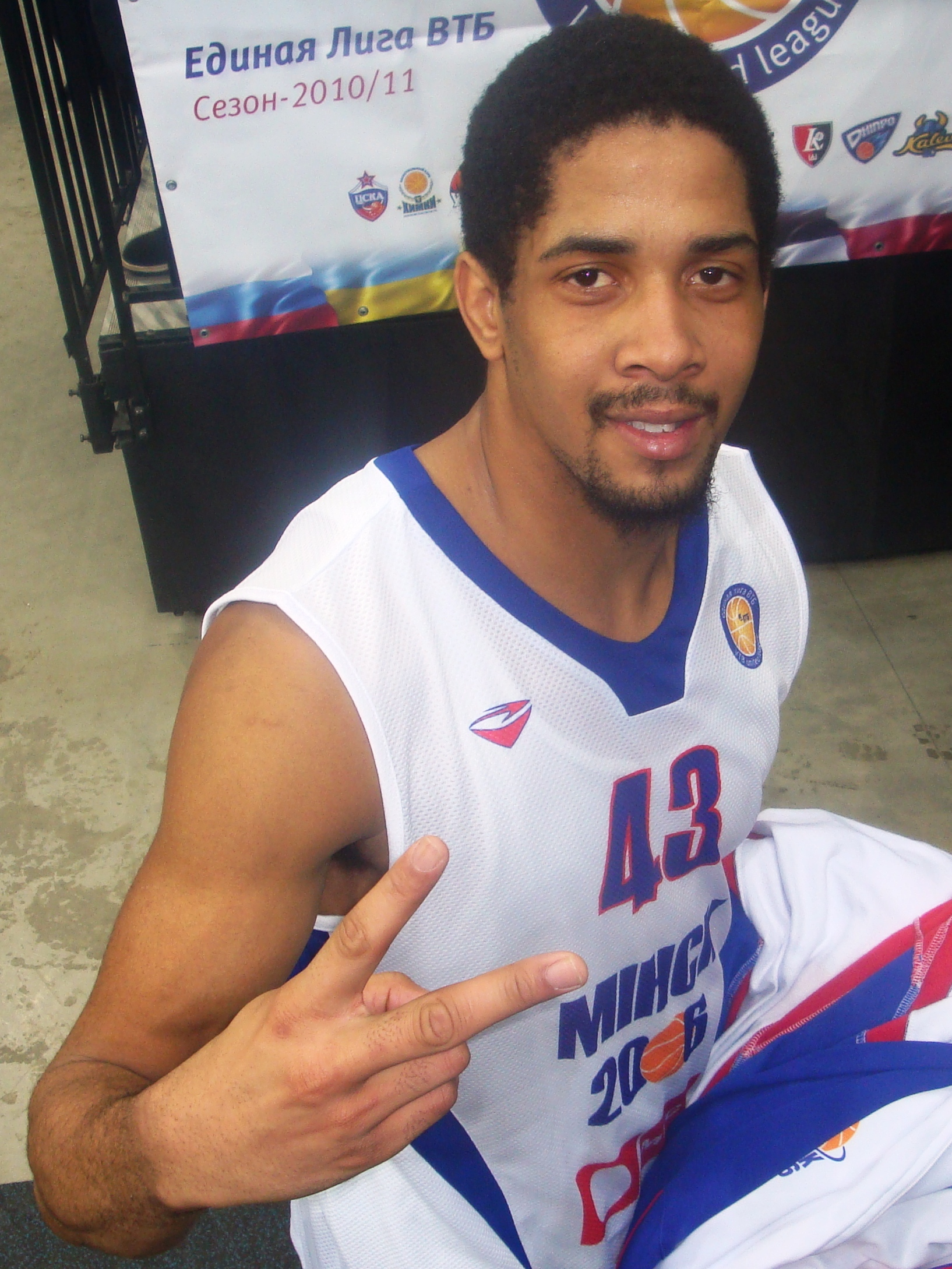
- McKee with Tsmoki-Minsk in December 2010

No. 0 – Borisfen
- Position: Point guard / shooting guard
- League: Belarusian Premier League

Personal information
- Born: March 7, 1986 (age 40) Philadelphia, Pennsylvania, U.S.
- Listed height: 6 ft 2 in (1.88 m)
- Listed weight: 185 lb (84 kg)

Career information
- High school: Bartram (Philadelphia, Pennsylvania)
- College: Coppin State (2005–2009)
- NBA draft: 2009: undrafted
- Playing career: 2009–present

Career history
- 2009–2010: Wollongong Hawks
- 2010–2011: Minsk-2006
- 2011–2013: Triumph Lyubertsy
- 2013–2014: UNICS Kazan
- 2014: Oldenburg
- 2015: Hapoel Jerusalem
- 2015–2016: Le Mans Sarthe
- 2016–2017: Türk Telekom
- 2017–2018: Hapoel Tel Aviv
- 2018: Cholet
- 2018–2019: Wilki Morskie Szczecin
- 2019: Panionios
- 2019–2020: US Monastir
- 2020–2021: Borisfen
- 2021–2022: APOP Paphos
- 2022–present: Borisfen

Career highlights
- Israeli League champion (2015); French Cup winner (2016); Russian Cup winner (2014); All-NBL First Team (2010); MEAC Player of the Year (2009)
- Stats at Basketball Reference

Tywain McKee (born March 7, 1986) is an American professional basketball player for BC Borisfen of the Belarusian Premier League. He played college basketball for Coppin State University, where he was named the MEAC Player of the Year in 2009. McKee played professional basketball in Australia, Belarus, Russia, Germany, Israel, France, Turkey, Poland and Greece.

== College career ==
McKee played college basketball at Coppin State University and was a member of the 2007–08 Eagles team that went to the NCAA tournament with a 16–20 record. He was also the 2008 player of the year for the Mid-Eastern Athletic Conference.

== Professional career ==
=== Wollongong Hawks (2009–2010) ===
After going undrafted, McKee joined the Washington Wizards for the 2009 NBA Summer League. McKee started his professional career with Australian team Wollongong Hawks, where he was named to the All-NBL First Team in 2010.

=== Triumph Lyubertsy (2012–2013) ===
On June 28, 2012, McKee signed a one-year contract extension with Triumph Lyubertsy. On November 21, 2012, McKee recorded a career-high 32 points, shooting 11-of-16 from the field, along with six rebounds, six assists and four steals in a 91–84 win over VEF Rīga. McKee finished the season as the EuroCup leading player in efficiency rating (23.6 per game) and second-leading player in assists (6 per game). McKee was named two-time the EuroCup MVP of Week.

=== UNICS Kazan (2013–2014) ===
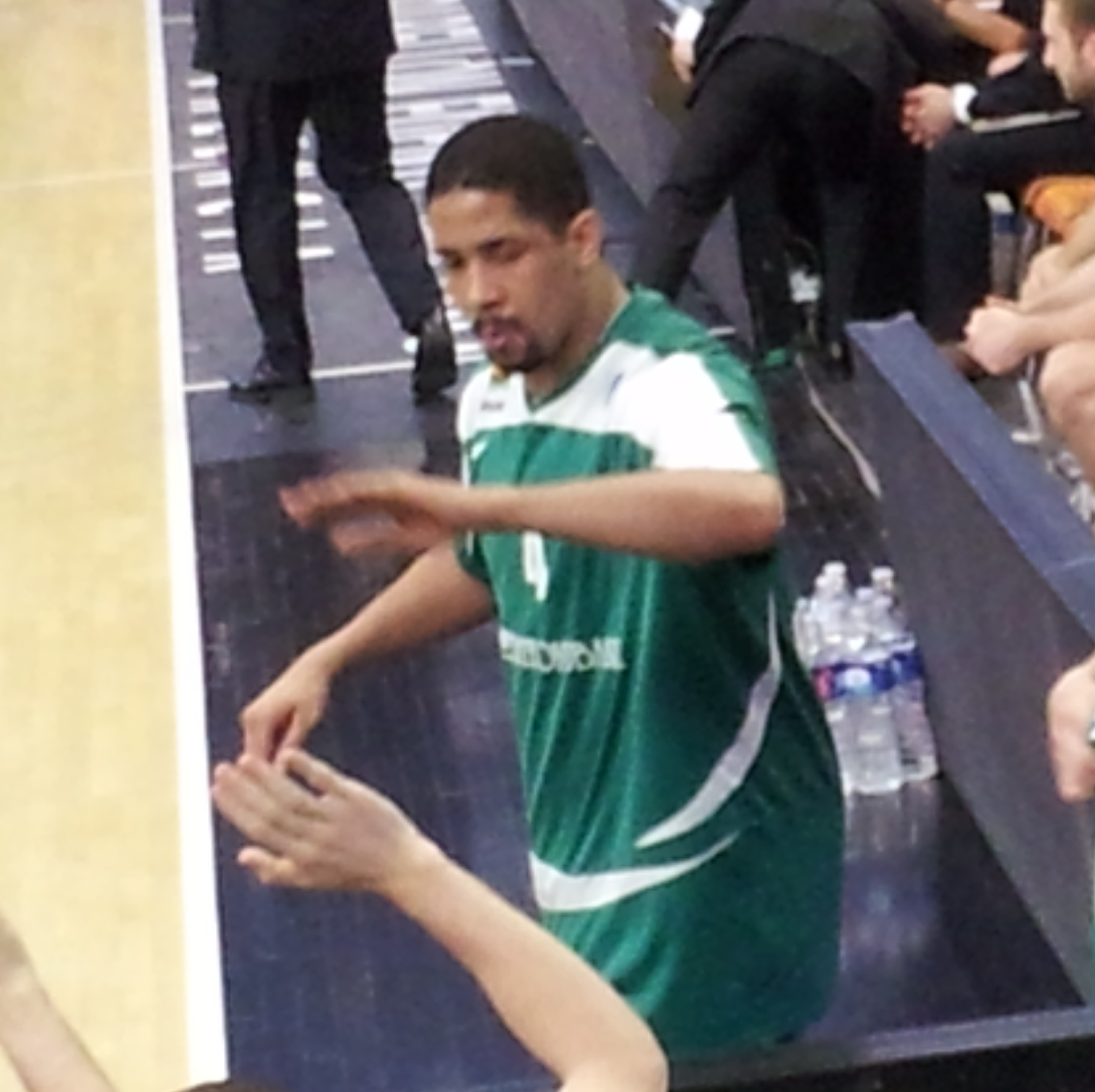
McKee with UNICS Kazan in May 2014

On July 10, 2013, McKee joined the Toronto Raptors for the 2013 NBA Summer League. One week later, McKee signed with UNICS Kazan of Russia for the 2013–14 season. McKee helped Kazan to win the 2014 Russian Cup, as well as reaching the 2014 EuroCup Finals.

=== EWE Baskets Oldenburg (2014–2015) ===
On August 1, 2014, McKee signed with the German team EWE Baskets Oldenburg for the 2014–15 season. On October 27, 2014, McKee parted ways with Oldenburg after appearing in eight games.

=== Hapoel Jerusalem (2015) ===
On January 7, 2015, McKee joined the Israeli team Hapoel Jerusalem for the rest of the season. McKee helped Jerusalem to win the 2015 Israeli League Championship.

=== Le Mans (2015–2016) ===
On July 23, 2015, McKee signed with French team Le Mans Sarthe for the 2015–16 season. On December 22, 2015, McKee tied his career-high 32 points, shooting 12-of-18 from the field, along with six rebounds and three assists in an 82–71 win over Nanterre. McKee helped Le Mans to win the 2016 French Cup.

=== Türk Telekom (2016–2017) ===
On August 22, 2016, McKee signed a one-year deal with Türk Telekom of the Turkish Basketball First League.

=== Hapoel Tel Aviv (2017–2018) ===
On August 2, 2017, McKee signed with Israeli team Hapoel Tel Aviv for the 2017–18 season, joining his former head coach Danny Franco. On February 17, 2018, McKee recorded a season-high 22 points, shooting 5-of-7 from the field, along with three rebounds and seven assists in an 85–86 loss to Hapoel Gilboa Galil. McKee helped Hapoel to reach the 2018 Israeli League Final Four, where they eventually lost to Maccabi Tel Aviv.

=== Cholet Basket (2018) ===
On July 23, 2018, McKee signed a one-year deal with the French team Cholet Basket.

=== Wilki Morskie Szczecin (2018–2019) ===
On December 23, 2018, McKee parted ways with Cholet to join the Polish team Wilki Morskie Szczecin for the rest of the season. However, on February 4, 2019, McKee parted ways with Szczecin after appearing in five games.

=== Panionios (2019) ===
On March 1, 2019, McKee signed with the Greek team Panionios for the rest of the season.

=== US Monastir (2019–2020) ===
On October 12, 2019, McKee signed with the Tunisian team US Monastir for the rest of the season.

=== BC Borisfen (2020–2021) ===
McKee spent the 2020-21 season with BC Borisfen in Belarus, averaging 11.5 points, four assists, three rebounds, and 1.7 steals per game.

=== APOP Paphos B.C. (2021–present) ===
On September 5, 2021, McKee signed with APOP Paphos B.C. of the Cyprus Basketball Division A.

== Career statistics ==
Legend
GP	Games played	MPG	Minutes per game	FG%	Field goal percentage
3P%	3-point field goal percentage	FT%	Free throw percentage	RPG	Rebounds per game
APG	Assists per game	SPG	Steals per game	BPG	Blocks per game
PPG	Points per game	**Bold**	Career high		Led the league

=== EuroCup ===
Year	Team	GP	GS	MPG	FG%	3P%	FT%	RPG	APG	SPG	BPG	PPG	PIR
2012–13	(Russia) Triumph Lyubertsy	11	11	36.4	.475	.270	.736	5.7	6.1	2.4	.2	17.9	23.6
2013–14	(Russia) UNICS Kazan	24	11	18.5	.413	.403	.729	1.2	1.8	.8	0	7.2	5.8
2014–15	(Germany) Oldenburg	2	1	24.4	.214	.200	.750	2.0	4.5	1.5	0	5.0	6.0
2015–16	(France) Le Mans	10	10	33.4	.391	.396	.846	3.2	3.9	1.4	0	14.9	16.3

Source: EuroCup

=== College ===
Year	Team	GP	GS	MPG	FG%	3P%	FT%	RPG	APG	SPG	BPG	PPG
2005–06	Coppin State	29	26	31.6	.422	.367	.762	4.2	2.4	1.5	0.1	15.4
2006–07	Coppin State	32	**32**	34.0	.401	.316	.769	4.3	3.0	2.0	0.1	17.3
2007–08	Coppin State	**34**	29	35.4	**.440**	**.438**	**.870**	4.3	3.1	1.5	0.1	16.5
2008–09	Coppin State	32	**32**	**36.8**	.404	.360	.808	**5.7**	**4.0**	**2.8**	0.1	**18.4**
Career		127	119	34.5	.416	.367	.805	4.6	3.1	1.9	0.1	16.9

Source: RealGM
