= Larry Stewart (basketball) =

American basketball coach and player

Coppin State Eagles
- Title: Head coach
- League: Mid-Eastern Athletic Conference

Personal information
- Born: September 21, 1968 (age 58) Philadelphia, Pennsylvania, U.S.
- Listed height: 6 ft 8 in (2.03 m)
- Listed weight: 220 lb (100 kg)

Career information
- High school: Dobbins Tech (Philadelphia, Pennsylvania)
- College: Coppin State (1988–1991)
- NBA draft: 1991: undrafted
- Playing career: 1991–2008
- Position: Power forward / small forward
- Number: 33, 23
- Coaching career: 2009–present

Career history

Playing
- 1991–1995: Washington Bullets
- 1995: Quad City Thunder
- 1995–1996: Zaragoza
- 1996–1997: Seattle SuperSonics
- 1997–1998: Galatasaray
- 1998–2001: Girona
- 2001–2002: Caceres
- 2002–2004: Peristeri
- 2004–2005: Maroussi
- 2005–2006: Olimpia Larissa
- 2006–2007: Paris Basket Racing
- 2007–2008: UJAP Quimper

Coaching
- 2009–2015: Bowie State (assistant)
- 2015–2019: Morgan State (assistant)
- 2019–2023: Maryland Eastern Shore (assistant)
- 2023–present: Coppin State

Career highlights
- As player: NBA All-Rookie Second Team (1992); Greek League All-Star (2006); 2× MEAC Player of the Year (1990, 1991); 2× First-team All-MEAC (1990, 1991); Second-team All-MEAC (1989)
- Stats at NBA.com
- Stats at Basketball Reference

Larry Stewart (born September 21, 1968) is an American basketball coach and former player. He is currently the head coach for the Coppin State Eagles, his alma mater.

== Early life ==
Stewart grew up in North Philadelphia. Due to his mother's strict religious beliefs as a Jehova's Witness, he was not permitted to play organized basketball until his junior year of high school.

== Playing career ==
=== College career ===
Stewart attended Coppin State University where he led his team to the 1990 NCAA Tournament, the first appearance in school history. Coppin State was a 15 seed and lost to Derrick Coleman's Syracuse squad 70–48 in the first round.

=== Professional career ===
After college, he signed as an undrafted free agent with the Washington Bullets in 1991. He averaged 10.4 points, and 5.9 rebounds in his rookie season (1991–92), and was named to the NBA All-Rookie Second Team. He was the first undrafted player in NBA history to make an All-NBA Rookie Team.

Stewart's professional career also included stints with the NBA's Vancouver Grizzlies and Seattle SuperSonics before he embarked on a 10-year stretch playing in Europe.

== Coaching career ==
Stewart was named head coach at Coppin State on May 2, 2023. He had previously served as an assistant coach at Bowie State, Morgan State, and Maryland Eastern Shore.

== Personal life ==
Both of Stewart's younger brothers, Stephen and Lynard Stewart, are also former basketball players and current coaches.

=== Shooting ===
At 4:30 AM on January 8, 1994, Stewart was shot and stabbed during a break-in at his Baltimore County home. He was taken to the University of Maryland Shock Trauma Center for treatment. Neither injury was fatal nor permanently damaging. Police said the suspects broke in by shattering a sliding door in the back of the house. They pulled Stewart from his bed, bound his hands and feet and shot him. Although Stewart could not describe his assailants he asserted four men were involved.

== NBA career statistics ==
Legend
GP	Games played	GS	Games started	MPG	Minutes per game
FG%	Field goal percentage	3P%	3-point field goal percentage	FT%	Free throw percentage
RPG	Rebounds per game	APG	Assists per game	SPG	Steals per game
BPG	Blocks per game	PPG	Points per game	**Bold**	Career high

=== Regular season ===
Year	Team	GP	GS	MPG	FG%	3P%	FT%	RPG	APG	SPG	BPG	PPG
1991–92	Washington	76	**43**	**29.3**	.514	.000	**.807**	**5.9**	1.6	**0.7**	**0.6**	**10.4**
1992–93	Washington	**81**	8	22.5	**.543**	.000	.727	4.7	**1.8**	0.6	0.4	9.8
1993–94	Washington	3	0	11.7	.375	.000	.700	2.3	0.7	**0.7**	0.3	4.3
1994–95	Washington	40	0	8.7	.461	.000	.667	1.7	0.5	0.4	0.2	2.6
1996–97	Seattle	70	21	14.0	.444	**.243**	.720	2.4	0.7	0.4	0.3	4.3
Career		270	72	20.1	.509	.205	.753	4.0	1.3	0.5	0.4	7.4

=== Playoffs ===
Year	Team	GP	GS	MPG	FG%	3P%	FT%	RPG	APG	SPG	BPG	PPG
1997	Seattle	**4**	**0**	**4.0**	**.833**	**.500**	**1.000**	**0.3**	**0.5**	**0.5**	**0.3**	**3.3**
Career		4	0	4.0	.833	.500	1.000	0.3	0.5	0.5	0.3	3.3

== Head coaching record ==
Record table
Season	Team	Overall	Conference	Standing	Postseason
Coppin State Eagles (MEAC) (2023–present)
2023–24	Coppin State	2–27	1–13	8th	
2024–25	Coppin State	6–24	4–10	7th	
2025–26	Coppin State	7–24	5–9	T–6th	
2026–27	Coppin State	1–2	0–0		
Coppin State:		16–77 (.172)	10–32 (.238)		
Total:		16–77 (.172)			
National champion Postseason invitational champion Conference regular season champion Conference regular season and conference tournament champion Division regular season champion Division regular season and conference tournament champion Conference tournament champion
