= Jeremy Ingram =

American basketball player

Free agent
- Position: Shooting guard

Personal information
- Born: April 4, 1992 (age 34) Charlotte, North Carolina, U. S.
- Listed height: 6 ft 3 in (1.91 m)
- Listed weight: 175 lb (79 kg)

Career information
- High school: East Mecklenburg (Charlotte, North Carolina)
- College: North Carolina Central (2010–2014)
- NBA draft: 2014: undrafted
- Playing career: 2014–present

Career history
- 2014–2015: Adanaspor Tigers
- 2015–2016: Mondi Melikşah Üniversitesi
- 2016: Quimsa

Career highlights
- MEAC Player of the Year (2014); 2× First-team All-MEAC (2013, 2014)

Jeremy Jerod Ingram (born April 4, 1992) is an American professional basketball player. He played college basketball for the North Carolina Central Eagles after the 2013–14 season. Ingram was named MEAC Player of the Year in 2014. He was also a member of the Eagles team that made their first NCAA Division I appearance.

Following the close of his college career, Ingram signed his first professional contract with the Adanaspor Tigers of the Turkish Basketball Second League.
