= Jahsha Bluntt =

American basketball player

Personal information
- Born: June 16, 1984 (age 42) Los Angeles, California, U.S.
- Listed height: 6 ft 6 in (1.98 m)
- Listed weight: 220 lb (100 kg)

Career information
- High school: Fairfax (Los Angeles, California)
- College: Delaware State (2003–2007)
- NBA draft: 2007: undrafted
- Playing career: 2007–2018
- Position: Shooting guard / small forward

Career history
- 2007–2008: Iowa Energy
- 2008: Sioux Falls Skyforce
- 2008–2009: SO Maritime Boulogne
- 2009–2010: Boulazac Basket Dordogne
- 2011–2012: Orchies
- 2014–2015: Timba Timișoara
- 2015–2016: La Rochelle Rupella
- 2016–2017: UJAP Quimper 29
- 2017: KTP Basket
- 2017–2018: Nift Al-Janoub

Career highlights
- 2× MEAC Player of the Year (2006, 2007); 2× First-team All-MEAC (2006, 2007); MEAC tournament MVP (2005)

Jahsha Lavone Bluntt (born June 16, 1984) is an American professional former basketball player.

== College career ==
He was raised in Los Angeles, California, and attended Fairfax High School. Bluntt was a standout basketball player for the school, and decided to continue playing at the college level. He chose Delaware State University, an historically black college which participates in the Mid-Eastern Athletic Conference (MEAC) of the NCAA. A 6'6", 220-pound shooting guard and small forward, he appeared in 61 total games through his first two seasons with the Hornets and averaged approximately 11.1 points per game during that span. During his sophomore season, however, Bluntt was responsible for tipping an offensive rebound to teammate Aaron Williams with 1.6 seconds remaining in the 2005 MEAC men's basketball tournament championship. Williams hit the jump shot to propel Delaware State past Hampton, 55–53, and into the NCAA tournament. Delaware State won both the MEAC regular season and conference championships for the only time in school history.

As a junior in 2005–06, Bluntt averaged 14.6 points, 4.8 rebounds, 1.2 assists and 1.1 steals per game. He also shot 41.3% from the field, 39.1% from three-point field goal range and 75.6% on the free throw line. Delaware State repeated as the MEAC regular season champions but failed to gain the automatic berth into the NCAA Tournament by winning the conference tournament championship. They were still selected to play in the 2006 National Invitation Tournament, and Bluntt was named the MEAC Player of the Year.

In 2006–07, Bluntt repeated as the MEAC Player of the Year behind averages of 15.5 points, 4.9 rebounds, 1.6 assists and 1.2 steals per game. He shot 42.3% from the field, 35.0% from three-point territory and 82.1% at the free throw line. Delaware State won their third consecutive regular season championship and qualified for the NIT in back-to-back seasons.

== Professional career ==
After college, Bluntt was selected 10th overall by the Yakama Sun Kings of the Continental Basketball Association as well as in the second round of the 2007 NBA Development League Draft by the Iowa Energy. Prior to playing for either team he tested the waters in a French professional league. He eventually came back and played for the Energy for only four games. The Sioux Falls Skyforce signed him in January 2008 and he then finished the season with them while appearing in 29 games.

In 2008–09, Bluntt played for SO Maritime Boulogne in France while averaging 18.6 points, 5.7 rebounds and 2.4 assists per game. He switched teams once again in 2009–10, this time playing for Boulazac Basket Dordogne in the Ligue Nationale de Basketball. Two seasons later, Bluntt signed with BC Orchies for the 2011–12 year, which is a club also found in France.
