= Malcolm Huckaby =

American basketball player (born 1972)

Personal information
- Born: April 7, 1972 (age 54) Bristol, Connecticut, U.S.
- Listed height: 6 ft 2 in (1.88 m)
- Listed weight: 218 lb (99 kg)

Career information
- High school: Bristol Central (Bristol, Connecticut)
- College: Boston College (1990–1994)
- NBA draft: 1994: undrafted
- Playing career: 1994–1998
- Position: Point guard
- Number: 12

Career history
- 1994–1995: Hermine de Nantes Atlantique
- 1996: Andrea Costa Imola

Malcolm Huckaby (born April 7, 1972) is an American retired professional basketball player, college basketball analyst and financial advisor.

After growing up right down the road from ESPN headquarters, Malcolm Huckaby, the former Boston College star, joined ESPN in November 2012 as a men's college basketball analyst. Huckaby is also currently the vice president of investments at Capital Securities Management in the greater Boston area, and has held that position since 2012. He was also a financial advisor for four years before being promoted as a private advisor at Merrill Lynch, a position he had for almost four years. His television career began in 2010 when he called his alma mater's basketball games with IMG Sports Network.

Huckaby previously played basketball professionally in Europe for five years and was also on the Miami Heat's roster in 1997. A standout guard at Boston College, where he graduated from in 1994, Huckaby helped lead the Eagles to the NCAA Tournament's Elite Eight in 1994. He was inducted into the 2015 ACC Basketball Legends class. The Bristol, Conn., native was inducted into the Boston College Varsity Club Athletic Hall of Fame in 2004. A two-sport star in high school, Huckaby was drafted by the Houston Astros in the 1989-90 MLB draft. He currently coaches at boys and girls club of greater Nashua
