= Kyle O'Quinn =

American basketball player (born 1990)

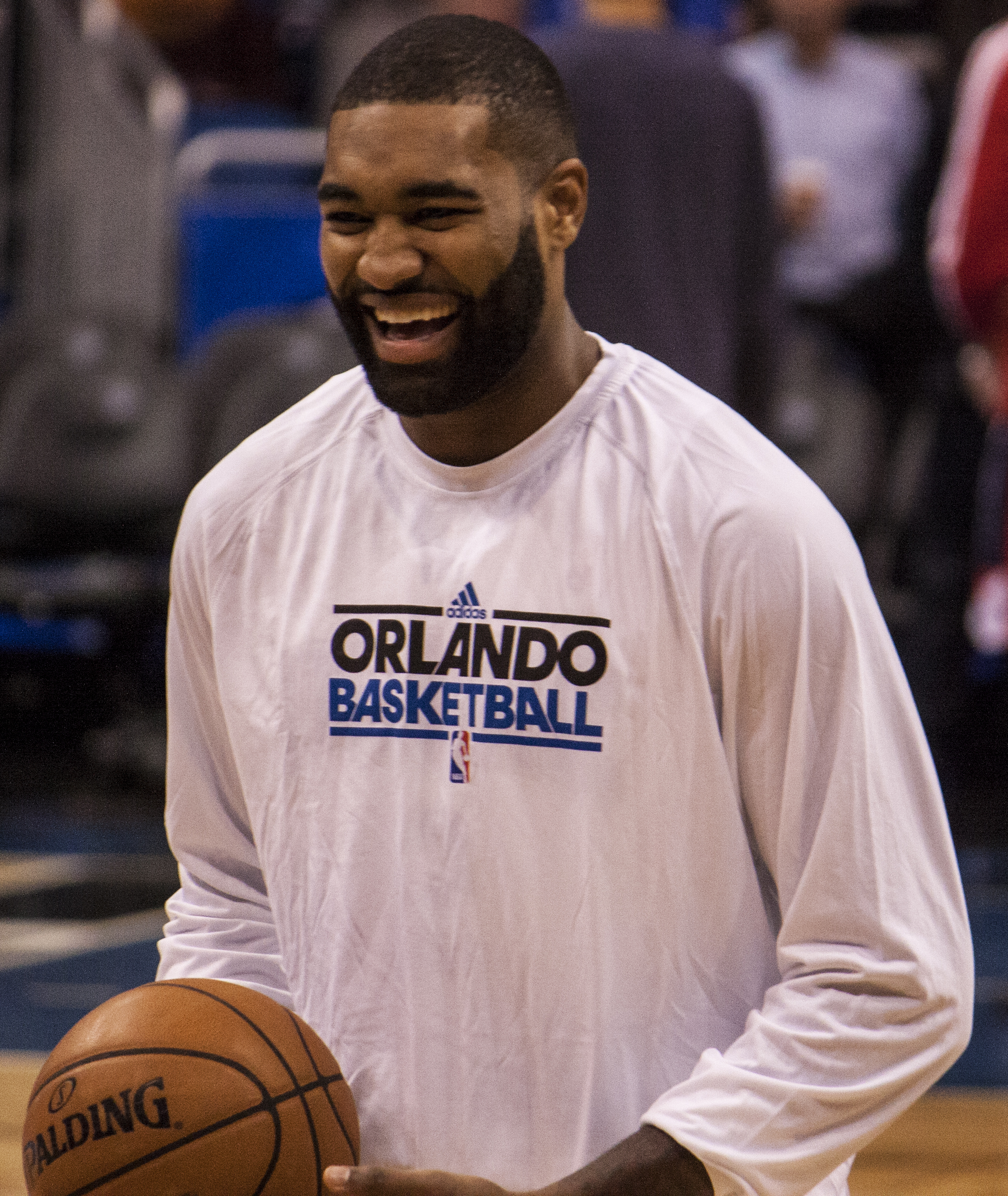
- O'Quinn with the Orlando Magic in 2012

Personal information
- Born: March 26, 1990 (age 36) Jamaica, New York, U.S.
- Listed height: 6 ft 9 in (2.06 m)
- Listed weight: 250 lb (113 kg)

Career information
- High school: Campus Magnet (Queens, New York)
- College: Norfolk State (2008–2012)
- NBA draft: 2012: 2nd round, 49th overall pick
- Drafted by: Orlando Magic
- Playing career: 2012–2023
- Position: Center / power forward
- Number: 2, 9, 10

Career history
- 2012–2015: Orlando Magic
- 2015–2018: New York Knicks
- 2018–2019: Indiana Pacers
- 2019–2020: Philadelphia 76ers
- 2021: Fenerbahçe
- 2021–2022: Paris Basketball
- 2022: SeaHorses Mikawa
- 2022–2023: San-en NeoPhoenix
- 2023: Sichuan Blue Whales

Career highlights
- Lou Henson Award (2012); MEAC Player of the Year (2012); 2× MEAC Defensive Player of the Year (2011, 2012); No. 10 retired by Norfolk State Spartans
- Stats at NBA.com
- Stats at Basketball Reference

Kyle Brandon O'Quinn (born March 26, 1990) is an American former professional basketball player. He played college basketball for the Norfolk State Spartans, and led them to a victory over the #2 seed Missouri Tigers in the second round of the 2012 NCAA Men's Division I Basketball Tournament. He was drafted in the second round of the 2012 NBA draft with the 49th overall pick, by the Orlando Magic.

== Early and personal life ==
O'Quinn was born in Queens, New York, and grew up in South Jamaica, Queens. His parents are Tommie (who moved to New York from Mississippi in 1963, worked for the Metropolitan Transportation Authority, and died in a car accident in September 2015) and Regina O’Quinn. He has an older sister, Rasheena Moss, who earned a degree in broadcast journalism from Hampton University in 2008.

While playing for the Knicks, O'Quinn moonlighted by booking gigs in New York as a bar mitzvah and bat mitzvah entertainer; dancing with the teenagers, signing autographs, joining in selfies with the kids, and chatting with the parents.

== High school career ==
O'Quinn first attended Holy Cross High School for his first two years of high school, playing only a limited amount on the school's junior varsity team. He then attended Math, Science Research & Technology High School at the Campus Magnet Complex in Queens, originally to play football, and almost quit basketball when he didn't play as a junior. In his senior year, he averaged 20 points, 12 rebounds, and 3 blocks per game, but his only scholarship offer was to Norfolk State University. He was a first-team All-Queens and third-team All-Public School Athletic League (PSAL) selection in his senior year.

== College career ==
O'Quinn originally planned on pursuing a career in football even after receiving a scholarship from Norfolk State mainly because of his basketball ability. O'Quinn could have given up basketball the way he had with football, but this time chose the other choice and focused on pursuing a career in the NBA. He graduated with a degree in interdisciplinary studies.

In his Norfolk State career, he played in 129 games, averaging 12.5 points, 8.5 rebounds, 2.19 blocks, and shot .553 (610–1,104) from the field. Norfolk State Retired his number 10 jersey on February 16, 2019.

=== Freshman season ===
In O'Quinn's freshman season at Norfolk State (2008–09), he appeared in all 31 games including two starts. He averaged 5.3 points per game and 3.4 rebounds per game. He was also twice named the Mid-Eastern Athletic Conference rookie of the week.

=== Sophomore season ===
In his sophomore season (2009–10), O'Quinn appeared in 30 games, starting in 29 of them. He was third on Norfolk State in scoring at 11.5 points per game, led the team in rebounds at 8.7 rebounds per game, and had 1.70 blocks per game. He also led the Mid-Eastern Athletic Conference (MEAC) in field goal percentage at 54.9%. O'Quinn was also named to the All-MEAC Second Team and was twice named the MEAC Defensive Player of the Week.

=== Junior season ===
In O'Quinn's junior season in 2010–11, he averaged 16.4 points per game, 11.1 rebounds per game, and 3.44 blocks per game. He was fourth in the country in blocked shots, fifth in rebounds, and eighth in double-doubles (19). O'Quinn led the MEAC in blocks and rebounds, was second in field goal percentage (.556), and finished fifth in points per game. He established single-season school records (NCAA Division I era) with 110 blocked shots and 355 rebounds. He also became the first-ever player from Norfolk State to be named MEAC Defensive Player of the Year. O'Quinn was named MEAC Defensive Player of the Week four times and was named MEAC Player of the Week four times as well, and was voted to the MEAC All-Tournament Team.

=== Senior season ===
In O'Quinn's senior season, he averaged 15.9 points per game, 10.3 rebounds per game, and 2.69 blocks per game. He led the conference and tied for fifth in the country with 20 double-doubles. He ranked 14th in the nation in field goal percentage (.573; 205–358), 15th in blocked shots, and 16th in rebounding. He was named the MEAC Player of the Year and the MEAC Defensive Player of the Year. He was the 2012 Lou Henson recipient as the nation's top mid-major player.

Norfolk State made the NCAA Division I men's basketball tournament as a 15 seed, the Spartans (making their first-ever postseason appearance) upset the second-seeded Missouri Tigers in the Round of 64. In the game, O'Quinn recorded 26 points and 14 rebounds. After the game, an ecstatic O'Quinn began sprinting through the school's hallways, yelling, "We messed up some brackets! We messed up some brackets!" In the next round, Norfolk State lost to the Florida Gators, and O'Quinn only recorded four points and three rebounds.

Following the season, O'Quinn participated in the Portsmouth Invitational Tournament, averaging 11.7 PPG, 11.7 RPG, and 3.7 BPG. O'Quinn was named the Tournament MVP, and was also named to the All-Tournament Team.

== Professional career ==
=== Orlando Magic (2012–2015) ===
O'Quinn was drafted in the second round of the 2012 NBA draft with the 49th overall pick by the Orlando Magic. On August 9, 2012, he signed his rookie scale contract with the Magic. He went on to earn the 2012–13 Hustle Player of the Year award for his constant commitment to playing every game with more excitement than the last. He finished the season with averages of 4.1 points and 3.7 rebounds in 57 games.

With 1.3 blocked shots per game in 2013–14, O'Quinn led the Magic and was tied for 20th in the league. He finished the season with averages of 6.2 points and 5.3 rebounds per game.

After spraining his ankle in the season opener against the New Orleans Pelicans on October 28, 2014, O'Quinn missed 15 consecutive games before returning to action on November 16. Over a five-game stretch with Nikola Vučević out with a back injury between December 2 and December 12, O'Quinn started all five games and subsequently averaged 15.4 points and 6.8 rebounds per game.

=== New York Knicks (2015–2018) ===
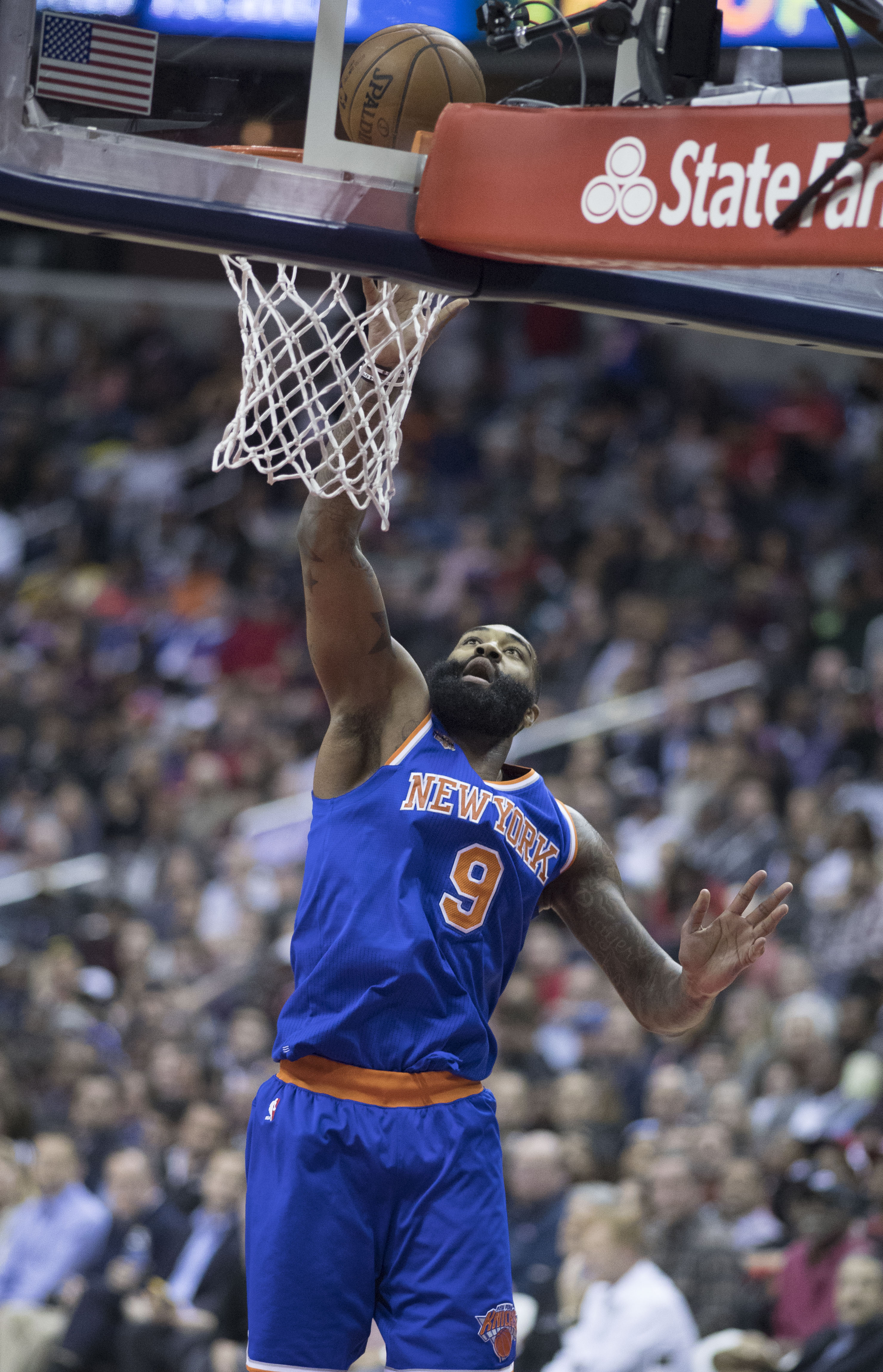
O'Quinn with the Knicks in 2017.

On July 9, 2015, O'Quinn was signed-and-traded (to a four-year, $16-million contract) from the Magic to the New York Knicks in exchange for cash considerations and the right to exchange 2019 second-round draft selections. He made his debut for the Knicks, his hometown team, in the team's season opener against the Milwaukee Bucks on October 28, recording 8 points and 11 rebounds in a 122–97 win. On February 24, 2016, he scored a season-high 19 points off the bench in a 108–105 loss to the Indiana Pacers.

On December 2, 2016, O'Quinn recorded season highs of 20 points and 13 rebounds in a 118–114 win over the Minnesota Timberwolves. On December 22, he recorded 14 points and a career-high 16 rebounds in a 106–95 win over the Orlando Magic. On March 16, 2017, he came off the bench to a tie a career high with 23 points in a 121–110 loss to the Brooklyn Nets.

On November 25, 2017, O'Quinn had his first double-double of the season with 20 points and 15 rebounds starting in place of the injured Enes Kanter in a 117–102 loss to the Houston Rockets.

=== Indiana Pacers (2018–2019) ===
On July 9, 2018, O'Quinn signed a one-year deal with the Indiana Pacers, after opting out of the final year of his contract in New York. His decision landed him $4.5 million, a $200,000 raise.

=== Philadelphia 76ers (2019–2020) ===
On July 11, 2019, O’Quinn signed a one-year deal with Philadelphia 76ers.

=== Fenerbahçe (2021) ===
On January 20, 2021, O'Quinn signed a one-year deal with Fenerbahçe of the Turkish Basketball Super League and the EuroLeague. On June 17, 2021, O'Quinn officially parted ways with the Turkish club.

=== Paris Basketball (2021–2022) ===
On September 2, 2021, O'Quinn signed with Paris Basketball of the LNB Pro A.

=== Sichuan Blue Whales (2023) ===
On September 24, 2023, O'Quinn signed with the Sichuan Blue Whales of the Chinese Basketball Association.

On April 12, 2025, O'Quinn announced his retirement from professional basketball.

== Career statistics ==
Legend
GP	Games played	GS	Games started	MPG	Minutes per game
FG%	Field goal percentage	3P%	3-point field goal percentage	FT%	Free throw percentage
RPG	Rebounds per game	APG	Assists per game	SPG	Steals per game
BPG	Blocks per game	PPG	Points per game	**Bold**	Career high

=== NBA ===
==== Regular season ====
Year	Team	GP	GS	MPG	FG%	3P%	FT%	RPG	APG	SPG	BPG	PPG
2012–13	Orlando	57	5	11.2	.513	.000	.668	3.7	.9	.2	.5	4.1
2013–14	Orlando	69	**19**	17.2	.501	.000	.687	5.3	1.1	**.6**	**1.3**	6.2
2014–15	Orlando	53	17	16.2	.492	**.279**	.772	3.9	1.2	**.6**	.8	5.8
2015–16	New York	65	1	16.2	.476	.227	.767	3.8	1.1	.3	.8	4.8
2016–17	New York	**79**	8	15.6	.521	.118	.771	5.6	1.5	.5	**1.3**	6.3
2017–18	New York	77	10	**18.0**	**.582**	.235	.772	**6.1**	**2.1**	.5	**1.3**	**7.1**
2018–19	Indiana	45	3	8.2	.507	.083	**.810**	2.6	1.2	.2	.6	3.5
2019–20	Philadelphia	29	2	10.8	.494	.259	.550	4.0	1.8	.2	.8	3.5
Career		472	65	14.2	.517	.218	.740	4.6	1.4	.4	1.0	5.4

==== Playoffs ====
Year	Team	GP	GS	MPG	FG%	3P%	FT%	RPG	APG	SPG	BPG	PPG
2019	Indiana	1	0	1.6	—	—	—	.0	.0	.0	.0	.0
2020	Philadelphia	1	0	**5.7**	—	—	—	**1.0**	**1.0**	.0	.0	.0
Career		2	0	3.6	—	—	—	.5	.5	.0	.0	.0

=== College ===
Year	Team	GP	GS	MPG	FG%	3P%	FT%	RPG	APG	SPG	BPG	PPG
2008–09	Norfolk State	31	2	16.7	.492	**.378**	.622	3.4	.4	.3	.8	5.3
2009–10	Norfolk State	30	29	28.3	.549	.239	.527	8.7	.9	.5	1.7	11.5
2010–11	Norfolk State	32	31	**32.8**	.556	.238	**.762**	**11.1**	1.0	.6	**3.4**	**16.4**
2011–12	Norfolk State	**36**	**36**	31.3	**.573**	.188	.696	10.3	**1.4**	**.7**	2.7	15.9
Career		129	98	27.5	.553	.261	.685	8.5	.9	.5	2.2	12.5
