= Florida A&M Rattlers basketball =

Florida A&M Rattlers
2025–26 Florida A&M Rattlers basketball team
- University: Florida A&M University
- Head coach: Charlie Ward (1st season)
- Location: Tallahassee, Florida
- Arena: Alfred Lawson, Jr. Multipurpose Center (capacity: 9,639)
- Conference: SWAC
- Nickname: Rattlers
- Colors: Green and orange

NCAA Division I tournament Sweet Sixteen
- 1959*, 1962*, 1978*

NCAA Division I tournament appearances
- 1957*, 1959*, 1962*, 1978*, 1999, 2004, 2007

Conference tournament champions
- SIAC: 1942, 1945, 1947, 1952, 1955, 1957, 1958, 1960, 1962, 1967, 1977, 1978; MEAC: 1991, 1999, 2004, 2007

Uniforms
Home	Away
- * at Division II level

The Florida A&M Rattlers basketball team is the men's basketball team that represents Florida A&M University in Tallahassee, Florida. The school's team currently competes in the Southwestern Athletic Conference. The team last played in the NCAA Division I men's basketball tournament in 2007. Their home arena is the Teaching Gym/Alfred Lawson Jr. Multipurpose Center, which seats a maximum of 9,639.

== Postseason results ==
=== NCAA Division I Tournament results ===
The Rattlers have appeared in the NCAA Division I Tournament three times. Their combined record is 1–3.

Year	Seed	Round	Opponent	Result
1999	16	First round	Duke	L 58–99
2004	16	Opening Round; First round	Lehigh; Kentucky	W 72–57; L 76–96
2007	16	Opening Round	Niagara	L 69–77

=== NCAA Division II tournament results ===
The Rattlers have appeared in the NCAA Division II Tournament four times. Their combined record is 3–4.

Year	Round	Opponent	Result
1957	Regional semifinals	North Carolina Central	L 61–78
1959	Regional semifinals Regional Finals	Lincoln (MO); North Carolina A&T	W 90–73; L 75–98
1962	Regional semifinals Regional Finals	Youngstown State; Wittenbert	W 74–60; L 33–35
1978	Regional semifinals Regional Finals	Livingston; Central Florida	W 72–69; L 78–85

== Rattlers in the NBA ==
- Jerome James
- Clemon Johnson
- Samuel Watts
- Bob Williams

== Rattlers in international leagues ==
- Amin Stevens (born 1990), professional basketball player for Elitzur Kiryat Ata in Israel
