= North Carolina A&T Aggies men's basketball =

2026–27 North Carolina A&T Aggies men's basketball team
- University: North Carolina A&T University
- Head coach: Monté Ross (4th season)
- Location: Greensboro, North Carolina
- Arena: Corbett Sports Center (capacity: 5,700)
- Conference: Coastal Athletic Association
- Nickname: Aggies
- Colors: Blue and gold

NCAA Division I tournament Final Four
- 1959*, 1964*
Other NCAA Division I tournament results
Elite Eight	1959*, 1964*
Sweet Sixteen	1958*, 1959*, 1964*
Appearances	1958*, 1959*, 1962*, 1964* 1982, 1983, 1984, 1985, 1986, 1987, 1988, 1994, 1995, 2013

Conference tournament champions
- 1972, 1973, 1975, 1976, 1978, 1979, 1982, 1983, 1984, 1985, 1986, 1987, 1988, 1994, 1995, 2013

Conference regular-season champions
- 1972, 1975, 1976, 1978, 1979, 1981, 1982, 1984, 1985, 1986, 1988, 1992, 2021

Conference division champions
- 2021
- * at Division II level

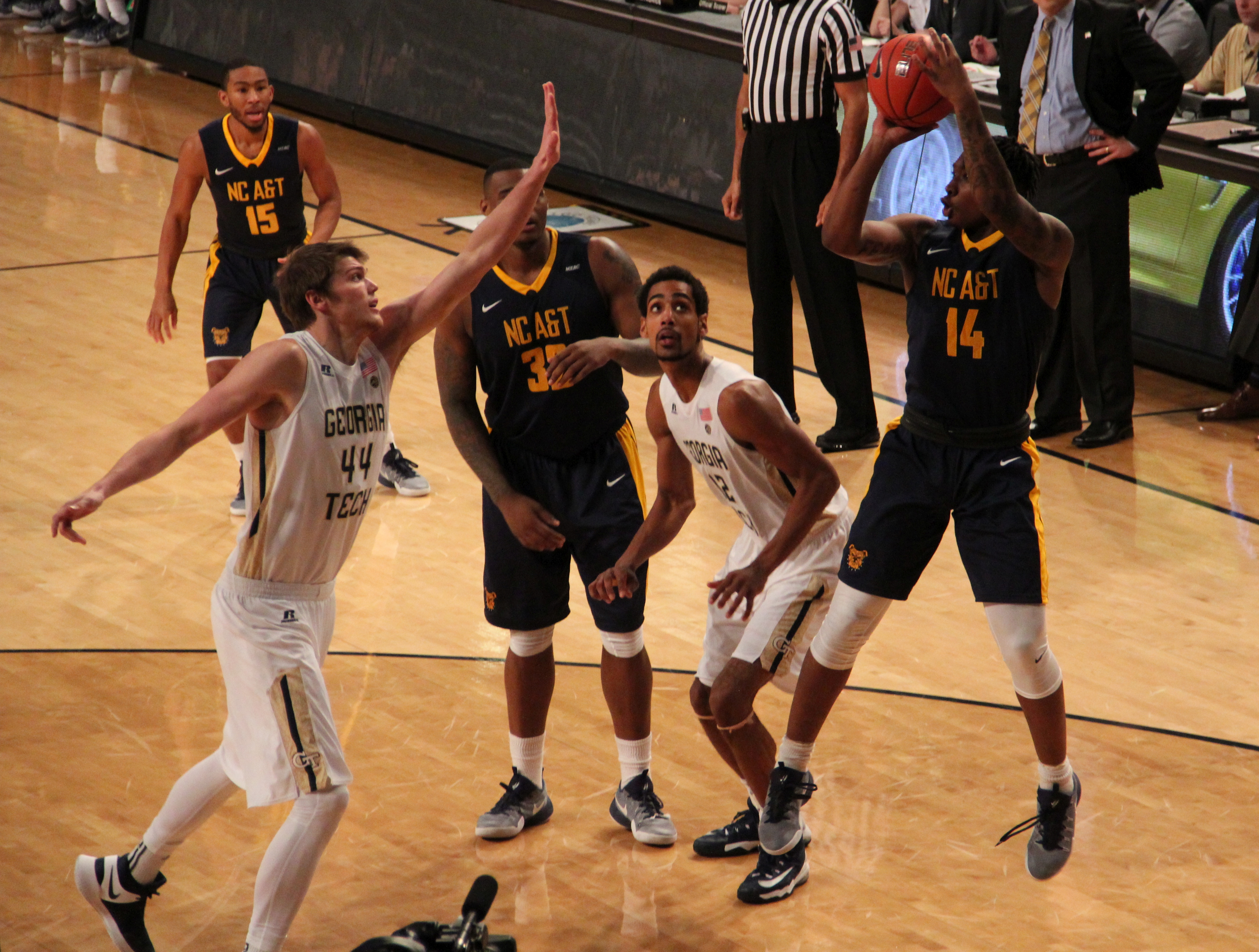
North Carolina A&T in a game against Georgia Tech

The North Carolina A&T Aggies men's basketball team represents North Carolina A&T State University in Greensboro, North Carolina, United States. The team currently competes in the Coastal Athletic Association, having formerly played in the Mid-Eastern Athletic Conference from 1970 to 2021. They are currently led by head coach Monté Ross. They play their home games at the Corbett Sports Center. The Aggies have appeared 10 times in the NCAA Division I men's basketball tournament, most recently in 2013.

== Postseason results ==
=== NCAA Division I Tournament results ===
The Aggies have appeared in ten NCAA Division I Tournaments. Their combined record is 1–10. The 2013 team made history when the Aggies won their first Division I post-season game (either NCAA or NIT), defeating Liberty.

Year	Seed	Round	Opponent	Result
1982	#12	Round of 48	#5 West Virginia	L 72–102
1983	#12	Preliminary Round	#12 Princeton	L 42–51
1984	#12	Preliminary Round	#12 Morehead State	L 69–70
1985	#16	Round of 64	#1 Oklahoma	L 83–96
1986	#16	Round of 64	#1 Kansas	L 46–71
1987	#15	Round of 64	#2 Alabama	L 71–88
1988	#14	Round of 64	#3 Syracuse	L 55–69
1994	#16	Round of 64	#1 Arkansas	L 79–94
1995	#16	Round of 64	#1 Wake Forest	L 47–79
2013	#16	First Four; Round of 64	#16 Liberty #1 Louisville	W 73–72; L 48–79

=== NCAA Division II Tournament results ===
The Aggies have appeared in four NCAA Division II Tournaments. Their combined record is 10–4.

Year	Round	Opponent	Result
1958	Regional Quarterfinals; Regional Finals	Philander Smith; Grambling State	W 68–64; L 73–88
1959	Regional Quarterfinals; Regional Finals; Elite Eight; Final Four; National 3rd Place Game	Tuskegee; Florida A&M; American; Evansville; Cal State Los Angeles	W 101–87; W 98–75; W 87–70; L 92–110; W 101–64
1962	Regional Quarterfinals; Regional 3rd Place Game	Evansville; Union	L 82–97; W 84–80
1964	Regional Quarterfinals; Regional Finals; Elite Eight; Final Four; National 3rd Place Game	Centre; Fisk; Adelphi; Akron; State College of Iowa	W 86–68; W 112–87; W 83–80; L 48–57; W 91–72

=== NIT results ===
The Aggies have appeared in the National Invitation Tournament (NIT) two times. Their record combined is 0–2.

Year	Round	Opponent	Result
1976	First Round	Providence	L 68–84
1981	First Round	Duke	L 69–79

=== CIT results ===
The Aggies have appeared in the CollegeInsider.com Postseason Tournament (CIT) one time. Their record is 0–1.

Year	Round	Opponent	Result
2018	First Round	Liberty	L 52–65
