= Coppin State Eagles men's basketball =

Men's basketball team of Coppin State University

Coppin State Eagles
2025–26 Coppin State Eagles men's basketball team
- University: Coppin State University
- First season: 1964–65
- All-time record: 829–902 (.479)
- Athletic director: Derek Carter
- Head coach: Larry Stewart (3rd season)
- Conference: MEAC
- Location: Baltimore, Maryland
- Arena: Physical Education Complex (capacity: 4,100)
- Nickname: Eagles
- Colors: Blue and gold

Uniforms
Home	Away

NCAA tournament round of 32
- 1997

NCAA tournament appearances
- 1990, 1993, 1997, 2008

Conference tournament champions
- 1990, 1993, 1997, 2008

Conference regular-season champions
- 1990, 1991, 1993, 1994, 1995, 1996, 1997, 1998, 1999, 2004, 2021

Conference division regular-season champions
- 2021

The Coppin State Eagles men's basketball team represents Coppin State University in Baltimore, Maryland, United States. The school's team currently competes in the NCAA Division I in the Mid-Eastern Athletic Conference.

== History ==
The Eagles began play during the 1964-65 season. They joined the NAIA for the 1967-68 season, and won the NAIA National Championship in 1976. They moved up to the NCAA Division I level prior to the 1985-86 season.

== Postseason results ==
=== NCAA tournament results ===
The Eagles have appeared in the NCAA tournament four times. Their combined record is 1–4. The 1996–97 team was only the third 15 seed to beat a 2 seed in the tournament. The 2007–08 Coppin State team was the first program with 20 losses to play in the NCAA tournament.

Year	Seed	Round	Opponent	Result
1990	#15	First Round	#2 Syracuse	L 48–70
1993	#15	First Round	#2 Cincinnati	L 66–93
1997	#15	First Round; Second Round	#2 South Carolina #10 Texas	W 78–65; L 81–82
2008	#16	Opening Round	#16 Mount St. Mary's	L 60–69

=== NAIA tournament results ===
The Eagles have appeared in the NAIA Tournament one time. Their record is 5–0, winning the National Championship in 1976.

Year	Round	Opponent	Result
1976	First Round; Second Round; Quarterfinals; Semifinals; National Championship	Dowling; Wisconsin–Parkside; Texas Southern; Marymount; Henderson State	W 78–55; W 68–67; W 88–77; W 82–81; W 96–91

=== NIT results ===
The Eagles have appeared in the National Invitation Tournament (NIT) two times. Their combined record is 1–2.

Year	Round	Opponent	Result
1991	First Round	SW Missouri State	L 47–57
1995	First Round; Second Round	Saint Joseph's; South Florida	W 75–68; L 59–75

== Notable former players ==
- Michael Norwood (PBL Buffalo Stampede) (2009–2010)
- Joe Pace (NBA Washington Bullets) (1976–1978)
- Larry Stewart (NBA Washington Bullets) (1991–1995)
