= Norfolk State Spartans men's basketball =

American men's college basketball team

2026–27 Norfolk State Spartans men's basketball team
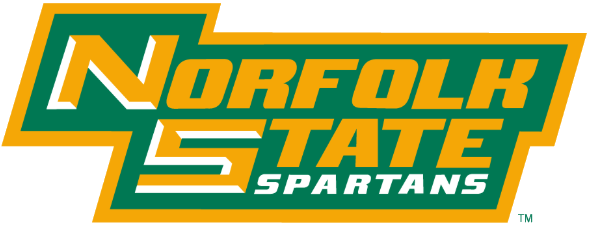
- University: Norfolk State University
- Head coach: Robert Jones (14th season)
- Location: Norfolk, Virginia
- Arena: Echols Hall (capacity: 7,000)
- Conference: MEAC
- Nickname: Spartans
- Colors: Green and gold

NCAA Division I tournament Final Four
- 1995*
Other NCAA Division I tournament results
Elite Eight	1974*, 1986*, 1987*, 1994*, 1995*
Sweet Sixteen	1968*, 1971*, 1974*, 1984*, 1986*, 1987*, 1994*, 1995*
Appearances	1965*, 1968*, 1969*, 1971*, 1974*, 1984*, 1985*, 1986*, 1987*, 1988*, 1989*, 1990*, 1992*, 1994*, 1995*, 2012, 2021, 2022, 2025

Conference tournament champions
- MEAC: 2012, 2021, 2022, 2025; CIAA: 1965, 1968, 1971, 1972, 1974, 1975, 1976, 1978, 1984, 1986, 1990, 1996

Conference regular-season champions
- 2013, 2019, 2021, 2022, 2024, 2025

Conference division champions
- 2021

Uniforms
Home	Away
- * at Division II level

The Norfolk State Spartans men's basketball team represents Norfolk State University, located in Norfolk, Virginia, in NCAA Division I basketball competition. They currently compete in the Mid-Eastern Athletic Conference. The Spartans are currently coached by Robert Jones and play their home games at the Joseph G. Echols Memorial Hall.

The Spartans men's basketball team is best known for defeating the #2 seeded Missouri in the 2012 NCAA Division I men's basketball tournament 86–84, the first tournament appearance for Norfolk State. It was only the fifth time that a 15th seed has defeated a 2nd seed. Norfolk State has qualified for the NCAA tournament at the Division I level four times, in 2012, 2021, 2022, and 2025.

== Post-season ==
=== NCAA Division I tournament results ===
The Spartans have appeared in four NCAA Division I tournaments. Their combined record is 2–4.

Year	Seed	Round	Opponent	Result
2012	#15	First Round; Second Round	#2 Missouri #7 Florida	W 86–84; L 50–84
2021	#16	First Four; First Round	#16 Appalachian State #1 Gonzaga	W 54–53; L 55–98
2022	#16	First Round	#1 Baylor	L 49–85
2025	#16	First Round	#1 Florida	L 69–95

=== NCAA Division II tournament results ===
The Spartans have appeared in the NCAA Division II tournament 15 times. Their combined record is 18–19.

Year	Round	Opponent	Result
1965	Regional semifinals Regional 3rd-place game	Bellarmine; Bethune-Cookman	L 74–91; W 91–74
1968	Regional semifinals Regional Finals	Denison; Ashland	W 108–86; L 51–61
1969	Regional semifinals Regional 3rd Place	Mount St. Mary's; Old Dominion	L 80–95; L 102–113
1971	Regional semifinals Regional Finals	Roanoke; Old Dominion	W 97–77; L 97–102
1974	First round Regional semifinals Regional Finals; Elite Eight	Randolph–Macon; Roanoke; Old Dominion; Assumption	W 74–72; W 84–75; W 89–76; L 79–89
1984	Regional semifinals Regional Finals	Winston-Salem State; Virginia Union	W 70–61; L 56–58
1985	Regional semifinals Regional 3rd-place game	Cal State Hayward; Montana State–Billings	L 61–64; W 90–78
1986	Regional semifinals Regional Finals; Elite Eight	Virginia Union; Mount St. Mary's; Sacred Heart	W 70–60; W 78–75; L 74–84
1987	Regional semifinals Regional Finals; Elite Eight	District of Columbia; Mount St. Mary's; Kentucky Westleyan	W 68–64; W 70–66; L 74–80
1988	Regional semifinals Regional 3rd-place game	Tampa; North Alabama	L 68–71; L 63–76
1989	Regional semifinals Regional 3rd-place game	North Carolina Central; Alabama A&M	L 64–67; L 80–93
1990	Regional semifinals Regional 3rd-place game	Florida Tech; Virginia Union	L 63–73; W 102–93
1992	Regional semifinals Regional 3rd-place game	Jonson C. Smith; Albany State	L 76–82; L 70–73
1994	Regional semifinals Regional Finals; Elite Eight	Longwood; Virginia Union; Washburn	W 61–59; W 71–69; L 58–69
1995	Regional semifinals Regional Finals; Elite Eight; Final Four	Johnson C. Smith; Virginia Union; Alabama A&M; Southern Indiana	W 89–61; W 84–66; W 85–67; L 81–89

=== NIT results ===
The Spartans have appeared in the National Invitation Tournament (NIT) twice. Their record is 1–2.

Year	Round	Opponent	Result
2013	First round	Virginia	L 56–67
2019	First round Second Round	Alabama; Colorado	W 80–79 ^{OT} L 60–76

=== CIT results ===
The Spartans have appeared in the CollegeInsider.com Postseason Tournament (CIT) five times. Their combined record is 2–4. They were the CIT champions in 2024.

Year	Round	Opponent	Result
2014	First round	Eastern Michigan	L 54–58
2015	First round	Eastern Kentucky	L 75–81
2016	First round	Columbia	L 54–86
2017	First round	Liberty	L 64–73
2024	Semifinals; Championship	Alabama A&M; Purdue Fort Wayne	W 81–66; W 75–67

=== Retired numbers ===
Three Spartan players have had their numbers retired by Norfolk State University. Kyle O’Quinn is the latest, with his number 10 retired by the school on February 16, 2019.

Norfolk State Spartans retired numbers
No.	Player	Years played
10	Kyle O’Quinn	2008–2012
12	Bob Dandridge	1965–1969
34	David Pope	1980–1984

== Spartans in the NBA ==
- Bob Dandridge
- Ray Epps
- Kyle O'Quinn
- David Pope

== Spartans in international leagues ==
- Kris Bankston (born 1999), basketball player in the Israeli Basketball Premier League
