= List of Lake Forest Academy alumni =

This list of alumni of Lake Forest Academy includes graduates and non-graduate former students.

== Arts ==
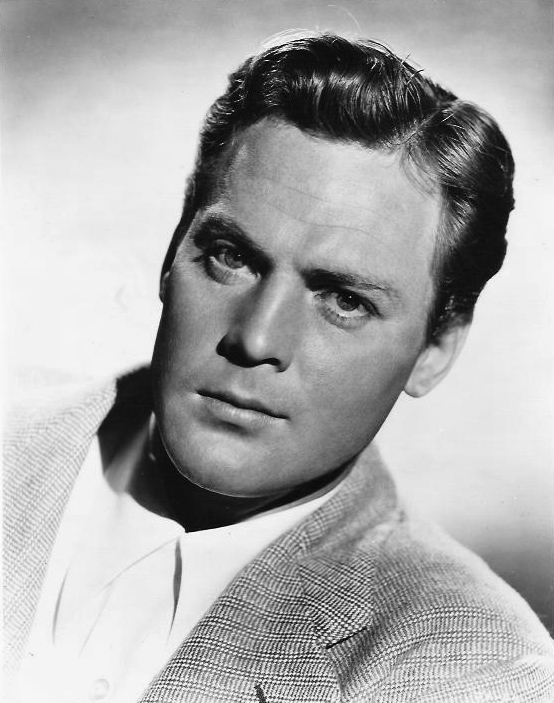
John Agar

- John Agar, actor, formerly married to Shirley Temple
- Bix Beiderbecke, jazz cornet player (expelled; attended 1921–22)
- David Bradley (1940), film director
- Temple Hoyne Buell (1914), architect, viewed as the father of the modern indoor shopping mall
- Jay Chandrasekhar, comedian and film director
- Max Demián (2005), performance artist
- Lindsay Glazer (1996), comedian
- Jesse Hibbs (1925), film director
- Brad Morris (1994), television actor
- Robert Myhrum (1944), television director
- Tom Neal, actor
- Kelly Perine (1987), actor
- McLean Stevenson, actor
- Stephen Wade (1970), folk musician
- Melora Walters (1979), actress

== Athletics ==
David Levine

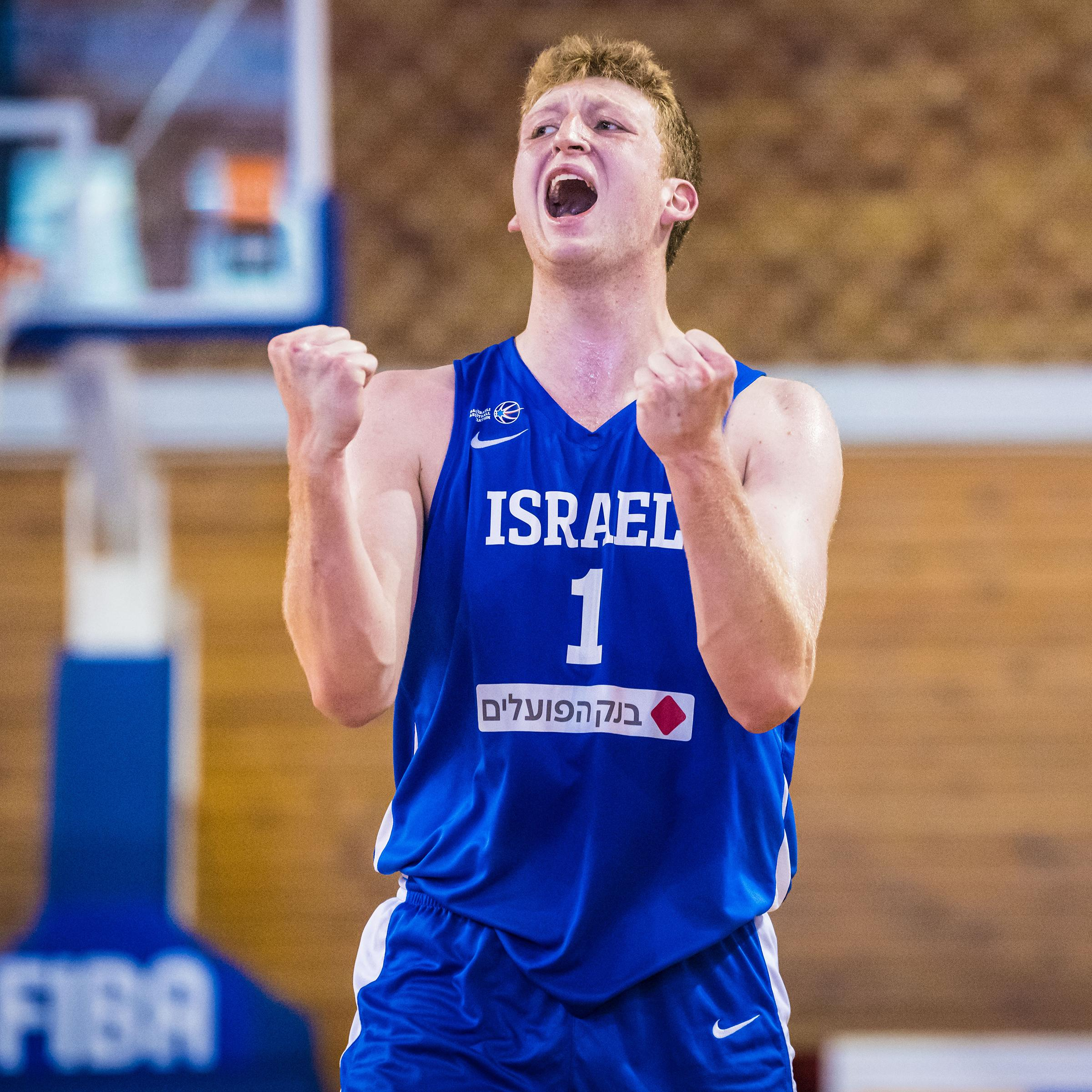
Danny Wolf

- Neil Blatchford (1964), speed skater who competed in the 1972 Winter Olympics
- Angus Brandt (attended 2008-09), Australian professional basketball player
- Alex DeBrincat, right winger for NHL's Detroit Red Wings
- Alfred Eissler, former NFL player
- Dylan Ennis, professional basketball player
- Babe Frump, former player for NFL’s Chicago Bears
- David Levine (2011), ARCA Racing Series race car driver for MAKE Motorsports
- Olivier-Maxence Prosper, Canadian professional basketball player for NBA’s Dallas Mavericks
- Teddy Purcell, retired right winger who played 10 seasons in the NHL
- Paul Schuette, former NFL player with the New York Giants, Chicago Bears, and Boston Braves
- Danny Wolf (attended 2018-21), American-Israeli professional basketball player for NBA’s Brooklyn Nets

== Business and law ==
- James Aubrey (attended 1931–32), president of CBS and MGM
- Charles Edmund Beard (1916), aviation pioneer and president of Braniff Airlines
- Andrew T. Berlin (1979), businessman and philanthropist; minority stakeholder in the Chicago Cubs Major League Baseball team
- Ralph Bogan, co-owned baseball's Milwaukee/Atlanta Braves
- James R. Cargill (1941), billionaire scion of Minnesota's Cargill family; pioneered in the computerization of animal feed formulations
- Gaylord Donnelley (attended 1923–24), former chairman of R. R. Donnelley & Sons
- Charles Gelatt (1935), businessman and philanthropist, early co-owner of the Milwaukee Brewers
- George N. Gillett Jr. (1956), communications mogul, former co–owner of the English Premier League team Liverpool F.C. and NASCAR auto-racing team Richard Petty Motorsports
- Louis Upton (1907), co-founder of Whirlpool Corporation
- Rawleigh Warner Jr. (attended 1935–36), chairman/CEO of Mobil Oil

== Government and public service ==
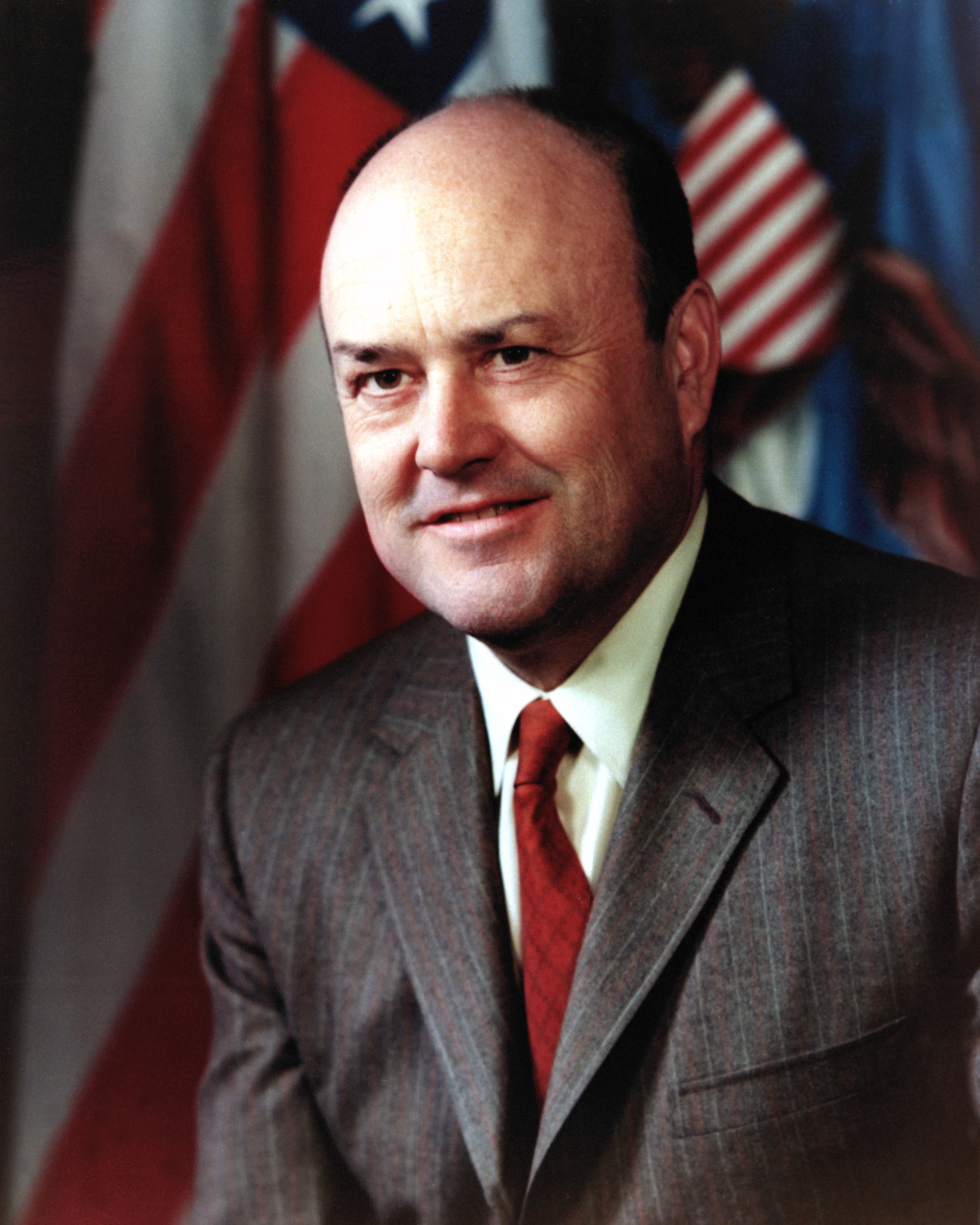
Melvin R. Laird

- Makola Abdullah (1986), 14th President of Virginia State University (VSU)
- Richard L. Conolly (1910), Admiral of the United States Navy during World War II
- Jan Crull Jr., Native American rights advocate, filmmaker, attorney
- Geoff Diehl, class of 1988, State Representative for the 7th Plymouth District of the Commonwealth of Massachusetts
- John Francis Grady (1948), United States District Court Judge; senior judge for the Northern District of Illinois
- Melvin R. Laird (attended 1938–39), US Congressman (1952–69) and Secretary of Defense (1969–73)
- Edward Everett Nourse, theologian
- Nauman S. Scott (1934), one of the first Louisiana U.S. District Court Judges to advocate desegregation
- Charles H. Wacker (1872), chairman of the Chicago Plan Commission and beer-maker

== Journalism and letters ==
- Bill Ayers, professor at the University of Illinois at Chicago who co-founded the Weather Underground
- Ward Just, Washington Post Vietnam War correspondent and author
- Michael Leonard, class of 1966, feature reporter for NBC's Today show
- Rebecca Makkai (1995), author
- Ralph J. Mills, poet and critic
- Robert Wilson Patterson (1867), newspaper publisher
- Bill Schulz (1994), Fox News

== Science ==
- Patrick M. McCarthy (surgeon), class of 1973, heart surgeon
- Cristopher Moore, class of 1983, computer scientist, mathematician, and physicist
- Karl Patterson Schmidt, herpetologist
- Paul Starrett, class of 1883, structural engineer
- Charles Thom, microbiologist and mycologist

== Other ==
- Robert S. Hartman, logician and philosopher
