= Alvin J. Schexnider =

Interim President of Norfolk State University
- In office 2005–2006
- Preceded by: Marie McDemmond
- Succeeded by: Carolyn W. Meyers

Personal details
- Born: May 26, 1945 (age 81)
- Education: Northwestern University; Grambling State University
- Profession: professor university administrator

Alvin James Schexnider Sr. (born May 26, 1945) is an American educator.

== Biography ==
Born in Lake Charles, Louisiana, in 1945, Schexnider attended Sacred Heart School and graduated from Grambling State University in Louisiana on his birthday in 1963. He earned a PhD in political science from Northwestern University in Evanston, Illinois, in 1973. He served as acting president of Norfolk State University in Virginia from July 2005 to July 2006.

== Personal life ==
Schexnider is Catholic.
