= Samuel Scott =

Samuel or Sam Scott may refer to:

== Law and politics ==
- Samuel Scott, 2nd Baronet of Lytchet Minster (1772–1849), British member of parliament
- Samuel H. Scott (politician) (fl. 1885), American politician in Arkansas
- Sir Samuel Scott, 6th Baronet (1873–1943), British member of parliament

== Sports ==
- Samuel Scott (footballer) (1873–1938), Scottish footballer
- Sam Scott (rugby league) (born 1990), British rugby league player
- Sam Scott (rugby union) (born 2005), Welsh rugby union player

== Others ==
- Samuel Scott (painter) (1702–1772), British painter
- Samuel Gilbert Scott (c. 1813–1841), American daredevil
- Samuel Parsons Scott (1846–1929), American attorney, banker, and scholar
- Sir Samuel Haslam Scott (1875–1960), English businessman, author and philanthropist
- Samuel Fischer Scott (1907–1988), African-American university director
- Samuel J. Scott (1938–2021), American aeronautical engineer
- Samuel Flynn Scott (born 1978), New Zealand musician
