= MPHL =

MPHL may refer to:

- Maritime Professional Hockey League, professional ice hockey league from 1911 to 1914
- Manitoba Hockey Association, ice hockey league later known as the "Manitoba Professional Hockey League"
- Male-pattern hair loss, a type of pattern hair loss
- Midwest Prep Hockey League, a high school ice hockey league consisting of preparatory schools
