= Ocean View Elementary School =

The following schools are officially called Ocean View Elementary School. Often they are unofficially and incorrectly shown as "Oceanview" instead of the correct "Ocean View" (with a space).

== United States ==
=== California ===
- Ocean View Elementary School teaches K to 5 in Albany, Alameda County
- Ocean View Elementary School teaches K to 6 in Arroyo Grande, San Luis Obispo County
- Ocean View Elementary School teaches K to 5 in Whittier, Los Angeles County

=== Virginia ===
- Ocean View Elementary School teaches Pre-K to 5 in Norfolk

=== Alaska ===
- Ocean View Elementary School teaches K to 6 in Anchorage

== Canada ==
=== Nova Scotia ===
- Ocean View Elementary School teaches K to 4 in Eastern Passage
