= Lyman Brooks =

Lyman Beecher Brooks

President of Norfolk State College
- In office 1969–1975
- Succeeded by: Harrison B. Wilson, Jr.

Provost of Norfolk State College
- In office 1963–1969

Director of Norfolk Unit of Virginia Union University
- In office 1938–1963
- Preceded by: Samuel Fischer Scott

Personal details
- Born: May 27, 1910
- Died: April 20, 1984 (aged 73) Norfolk Community Hospital; Norfolk, Virginia
- Spouse: Evelyn Brooks
- Education: University of Michigan Ph.D. M.Ed. Virginia Union University B.A.
- Profession: Educator; Principal; Teacher

Dr. Lyman Beecher Brooks (May 27, 1910 - April 20, 1984) was the first President of Norfolk State University in Norfolk, Virginia.

== Early life ==
Lyman Brooks was born on May 27, 1910, to John Robert Brooks, a former slave and Union Navy veteran, who made a living as a farmer, waterman, and private music teacher, and Mary Anna Burrell, a school teacher and graduate of Hartshorne Memorial College, now Virginia Union University.

== Education ==
Lyman Brooks went on to receive his undergraduate degree from Virginia Union University, and after serving many years as a teacher and principal, earned his master's degree and doctoral degree from the University of Michigan.

== Profession ==
In 1938, Lyman Beecher Brooks became Director of the Norfolk Unit of Virginia Union University (now Norfolk State University). During his thirty-seven year career as the director, provost and president of the college from 1938 to 1975, he helped build the school from a three-classroom junior college with five teachers to an eighteen building campus with a faculty and staff of 375 and 6,300 students. Dr. Brooks leadership helped the college achieve numerous milestones. Under Dr. Brook's leadership a faculty committee and student government developed regulations for university fraternities and sororities.

In 1942, the college became Norfolk Polytechnic College. Two years later in 1944, the school was renamed by the Virginia General Assembly's vote to make the school's name the Norfolk Division of Virginia State College, mandating it to become a part of Virginia State College. In 1952, the college's athletic teams adopted the "Spartans" name and identity. In September 1955, the school was relocated to a 55-acre campus on Corprew Avenue, formerly the Memorial Park Golf Course. The first degree which was a Bachelor's degree was presented by the institution in 1958. The college was separated from Virginia State College in 1969; therefore, Norfolk State College became an independent, four-year degree-granting institution with its own Board of Visitors and its own President.

== Personal life ==
Lyman Brooks served as a devoted trustee and Sunday school teacher at Bank Street Memorial Baptist Church in Norfolk and was a member of the Alpha Phi Alpha fraternity.

== Legacy ==
In 1972 a new library was completed and named the Lyman Beecher Brooks Library in honor of his many accomplishments. In 2012 the new Lyman Beecher Brooks Library, a LEED silver certified building was completed and rededicated in his honor.
