= Thurgood Marshall College Fund =

American non-profit organization

Coordinates: 40.707295°N 74.007584°W

- Abbreviation: TMCF
- Founded: 1987
- Founder: N. Joyce Payne
- Type: Educational non-profit
- Headquarters: 901 F Street NW, Suite 300; Washington, D.C., US
- Region served: United States
- Members: 55 member schools
- Chair of the board: Racquel Oden
- President & CEO: Harry L. Williams
- Main organ: Board of Directors
- Website: www.tmcf.org

The Thurgood Marshall College Fund (TMCF) is a non-profit organization that supports and represents nearly 300,000 students attending its 55 member-schools that include public historically black colleges and universities (HBCUs), medical schools, and law schools. The organization is named after the Supreme Court's first African-American Justice, Thurgood Marshall.

== History ==
The organization was established in 1987, under the leadership of Dr. N. Joyce Payne, in cooperation with Miller Brewing Company, Sony Music, the NBA, Reebok and the American Association of State Colleges and Universities to institutionally support public HBCUs. It underwent a name change in 2006 from the Thurgood Marshall Scholarship Fund to the Thurgood Marshall College Fund.

TMCF advocates for higher education at public historically black colleges and universities (HBCUs) and has grown from a small organization providing scholarships for public HBCUs, raising over $500 million to date for programmatic support, capacity building support, and scholarships for its member schools and the students matriculating on the campuses.

Its mission differs from that of the United Negro College Fund, which supported approximately 65,000 students at 900 colleges and universities with approximately $113 million in grants and scholarships in 2015 alone. The Thurgood Marshall College fund supports 55 schools and is a 501(c)(3) tax-exempt, charitable organization, which means it does not pay taxes on its income.

TMCF was granted $50 million in 2015 by Apple, $25.6 million in 2017 by the Charles Koch Foundation, and $6 million by The Boeing Company in 2018.

== Acquisitions ==
In 2013, TMCF acquired the Opportunity Funding Corporation (OFC), merging the two organizations with TMCF becoming the parent organization. Both organizations share a similar mission of providing service to the HBCU community, particularly in the area of talent identification. While continuing its efforts to enhance the entrepreneurship curriculum within public and private HBCUs, OFC will identify the promising future entrepreneurs and introduce them to potential investors and successful entrepreneurs.

== Leadership ==
- Harry L. Williams became president and CEO in 2018.
- Johnny C. Taylor Jr. was president and CEO from 2010 to 2018.
- Johnny Parham became the first executive director in 1994.
- Dwayne Ashley served as president and the chief executive officer from 1999 to 2010 and created the Leadership Institute and Member Schools Conference.

== Member schools listing ==
Member School Breakdown:

- 55 Member School Breakdown
  - 42 HBCUs: 4-year Historically Black Colleges and Universities
    - 6 LAW: HBCU Law Schools
    - 1 MED: HBCU Medical School
  - 3 PBIs: 4-year Predominantly Black Institutions
  - 7 Historically Black Community Colleges
  - 1 technical college

School	Type	City	State	Established	Endowment	Students	Parent institution	Sporting affiliations
Alabama A&M University	HBCU	Normal	Alabama	1875	$48.0 million (2019)	6,172 (Fall 2019)		NCAA Division I, FCS – SWAC
Alabama State University	HBCU	Montgomery	Alabama	1867	$94.5 million (2019)	4,190 (Fall 2019)		NCAA Division I, FCS – SWAC
Albany State University	HBCU	Albany	Georgia	1903	$3.21 million (2019)	6,122 (Spring 2021)	University System of Georgia	NCAA Division II, SIAC
Alcorn State University	HBCU	Lorman	Mississippi	1871	$20.2 million (2019)	3,523 (Fall 2019)		NCAA Division I, FCS – SWAC
Bluefield State University	HBCU	Bluefield	West Virginia	1895	$3.51 million (2019)	1,241 (Fall 2019)		NCAA Division II, CIAA
Bowie State University	HBCU	Bowie	Maryland	1865	$10.5 million (2019)	6,171 (Fall 2019)	University System of Maryland	NCAA Division II, CIAA
Central State University	HBCU	Wilberforce	Ohio	1887	$5.93 million (2019)	2,033 (Fall 2019)	University System of Ohio	NCAA Division II, SIAC
Charles R. Drew University of Medicine and Science	HBGI	Los Angeles	California	1966	$94.3 million (2019)	748 (Fall 2019)	Western Association of Schools and Colleges	n/a
Cheyney University of Pennsylvania	HBCU	Cheyney	Pennsylvania	1837	$1.47 million (2019)	627 (2020–21)	Pennsylvania State System of Higher Education	Independent
Chicago State University	PBI	Chicago	Illinois	1867	$5.16 million (2019)	2,620 (Fall 2021)		NCAA Division I, Independent
Coppin State University	HBCU	Baltimore	Maryland	1900	$11.9 million (2019)	2,724 (2019–20)	University System of Maryland	NCAA Division I, FCS - MEAC
Delaware State University	HBCU	Dover	Delaware	1891	$22.3 million (2019)	5,649		NCAA Division I, FCS - MEAC
Elizabeth City State University	HBCU	Elizabeth City	North Carolina	1891	$12.3 million (2019)	2,054	University of North Carolina System	NCAA Division II, CIAA
Fayetteville State University	HBCU	Fayetteville	North Carolina	1867	$24.8 million (2020)	6,551 (Fall 2019)	University of North Carolina System	NCAA Division II, CIAA
Florida A&M University	HBCU	Tallahassee	Florida	1887	$95.6 million (2020)	9,179 (Fall 2020)	State University System of Florida	NCAA Division I, FCS – SWAC
Florida A&M University College of Law	LAW	Tallahassee	Florida	1949		529	Florida A&M University	n/a
Fort Valley State University	HBCU	Fort Valley	Georgia	1895	$6.66 million (2019)	2,306 (Fall 2020)	University System of Georgia	NCAA Division II, SIAC
Grambling State University	HBCU	Grambling	Louisiana	1901	$7.25 million (2019)	5,232 (Fall 2019)	University of Louisiana System	NCAA Division I, FCS – SWAC
Harris–Stowe State University	HBCU	St. Louis	Missouri	1857	$1.4 million (2019)	1,630 (Fall 2019)		NAIA, AMC
Howard University	HBCU	Washington	District of Columbia	1867	$712.4 million (2020)	12,065 (Fall 2021)		NCAA Division I, FCS – MEAC
Howard University College of Medicine	MED	Washington	District of Columbia	1868			Howard University	n/a
Howard University School of Law	LAW	Washington	District of Columbia	1869		407	Howard University	n/a
Jackson State University	HBCU	Jackson	Mississippi	1877	$60 million (2019)	7,020 (fall 2019)		NCAA Division I, FCS – SWAC
Kentucky State University	HBCU	Frankfort	Kentucky	1886	$18.5 million (2019)	2,220 (Fall 2020)		NCAA Division II, SIAC
Langston University	HBCU	Langston	Oklahoma	1897	$50.8 million (2019)	2,190 (Fall 2019)	Oklahoma State System, OSU/A&M Board of Regents	NAIA, RRAC
Lincoln University	HBCU	Jefferson City	Missouri	1866	$1.65 million (2019)	2,436 (Fall 2019)		NCAA Division II, MIAA
Lincoln University	HBCU	Chester County	Pennsylvania	1854	$44.1 million (2019)	2,241 (2019)		NCAA Division II, CIAA (GLVC in 2024)
Medgar Evers College	PBI	New York	New York	1970	$528k (2019)	7,156	City University of New York	NCAA Division III, CUNYAC
Mississippi Valley State University	HBCU	Mississippi Valley State	Mississippi	1950	$2.69 million (2019)	2,147 (Fall 2019)		NCAA Division I, FCS – SWAC
Morgan State University	HBCU	Baltimore	Maryland	1867	$41.4 million (2020)	7,763 (Fall 2019)		NCAA Division I, FCS – MEAC
Norfolk State University	HBCU	Norfolk	Virginia	1935	$24.5 million (2019)	5,616 (Fall 2019)	Virginia High-Tech Partnership	NCAA Division I, FCS – MEAC
North Carolina A&T State University	HBCU	Greensboro	North Carolina	1891	$178 million (2022)	13,322 (Fall 2021)	University of North Carolina System	NCAA Division I, FCS – CAA (Note: North Carolina A&T football plays in CAA Football, which is administered by the all-sports CAA as a separate entity.)
North Carolina Central University	HBCU	Durham	North Carolina	1910	$39.5 million (2019)	8,207 (Fall 2018)	University of North Carolina System	NCAA Division I, FCS – MEAC
North Carolina Central University School of Law	LAW	Durham	North Carolina	1939		364 (full-time), 212 (part-time)	North Carolina Central University	n/a
Prairie View A&M University	HBCU	Prairie View	Texas	1876	$84.3 million (2019)	9,350 (Fall 2021)	Texas A&M University System	NCAA Division I, FCS – SWAC
Savannah State University	HBCU	Savannah	Georgia	1890	$9.05 million (2019)	3,688 (Fall 2019)	University System of Georgia	NCAA Division II, SIAC
South Carolina State University	HBCU	Orangeburg	South Carolina	1896	$10.8 million (2019)	2,479 (Fall 2019)		NCAA Division I, FCS – MEAC
Southern University	HBCU	Baton Rouge	Louisiana	1880	$9.58 million (2019)	7,091 (Fall 2019)	Southern University System	NCAA Division I, FCS – SWAC
Southern University Law Center	LAW	Baton Rouge	Louisiana	1947	$2.0 million (2019)	669 (Fall 2019)	Southern University System	n/a
Southern University at New Orleans	HBCU	New Orleans	Louisiana	1956	$3.09 million (2019)	2,309 (Fall 2019)	Southern University System	NAIA, GCAC
Southern University at Shreveport	JUCO	Shreveport	Louisiana	1967	$896k (2019)	2,932 (Fall 2019)	Southern University System	NJCAA, LCCAC
Tennessee State University	HBCU	Nashville	Tennessee	1912	$63.0 million (2020)	8,081 (Fall 2020)		NCAA Division I, FCS – OVC
Texas Southern University	HBCU	Houston	Texas	1927	$58.0 million (2019)	7,524 (Fall 2021)		NCAA Division I, FCS – SWAC
Thurgood Marshall School of Law	LAW	Houston	Texas	1946		600	Texas Southern University	n/a
Tuskegee University	HBCU	Tuskegee	Alabama	1881	$129.0 million (2019)	2,877 (Fall 2019)		NCAA Division II, SIAC
University of Arkansas at Pine Bluff	HBCU	Pine Bluff	Arkansas	1873	$3.81 million (2019)	2,498 (Fall 2019)	University of Arkansas System	NCAA Division I, FCS – SWAC
University of Maryland Eastern Shore	HBCU	Princess Anne	Maryland	1886	$29.7 million (2019)	2,886 (Fall 2019)	University System of Maryland	NCAA Division I, FCS – MEAC
University of the District of Columbia	HBCU	Washington	District of Columbia	1851	$49.5 million (2019)	4,199 (Fall 2019)		NCAA Division II, ECC
David A. Clarke School of Law	LAW	Washington	District of Columbia	1986		253 (Fall 2019)	University of the District of Columbia	n/a
University of the Virgin Islands	HBCU	St. Croix, St. Thomas, St. John	United States Virgin Islands	1962	$66.9 million (2020)	2,084 (Fall 2019)		NAIA, GCAC
Virginia State University	HBCU	Petersburg	Virginia	1882	$56.1 million (2020)	4,365 (Fall 2019)	Virginia High-Tech Partnership	NCAA Division II, CIAA
West Virginia State University	HBCU	Institute	West Virginia	1891	$14.3 million (2019)	4,120 (Fall 2019)		NCAA Division II, MEC
Winston-Salem State University	HBCU	Winston-Salem	North Carolina	1892	$35.3 million (2019)	5,121 (Fall 2019)	University of North Carolina System	NCAA Division II, CIAA
York College	PBI	Jamaica, Queens	New York	1966	$2.0 million (2019)	8,337 (Fall 2019)	City University of New York	NCAA Division III, CUNYAC
