= Frump =

Frump may refer to:

- "Mr. Frump in the Iron Lung", a song on the album "Weird Al" Yankovic by "Weird Al" Yankovic
- The surname of some of the characters in The Addams Family franchise
- Donald Frump, an elephant character in Rocko's Modern Life
- Judge Horatio Curmudgeon Frump, a character in Tumbleweeds (comic strip)
- Babe Frump, NFL player
- Bud Frump, a character in both the movie and musical theater version of How to Succeed in Business Without Really Trying
