= Paul Schuette =

American football player (1906–1960)

No. Giants 36, Bears 22, Braves 14
- Position: Guard

Personal information
- Born: March 10, 1906; South Bend, Indiana, U.S.
- Died: October 20, 1960 (aged 54)
- Listed height: 6 ft 0 in (1.83 m)
- Listed weight: 220 lb (100 kg)

Career information
- High school: Manitowoc (WI), Lake Forest (IL) Academy
- College: Wisconsin

Career history
- New York Giants (1928); Chicago Bears (1930–1932); Boston Braves (1932)
- Stats at Pro Football Reference

Paul August Schuette Jr. (March 10, 1906 – October 20, 1960) was an American football offensive lineman in the National Football League (NFL) for the New York Giants, Chicago Bears, and the Boston Braves. He played football at the prestigious Lake Forest Academy in Lake Forest, Illinois and later at the University of Wisconsin–Madison. Schuette died as a result of an illness.
