= Makola Abdullah =

American university administrator

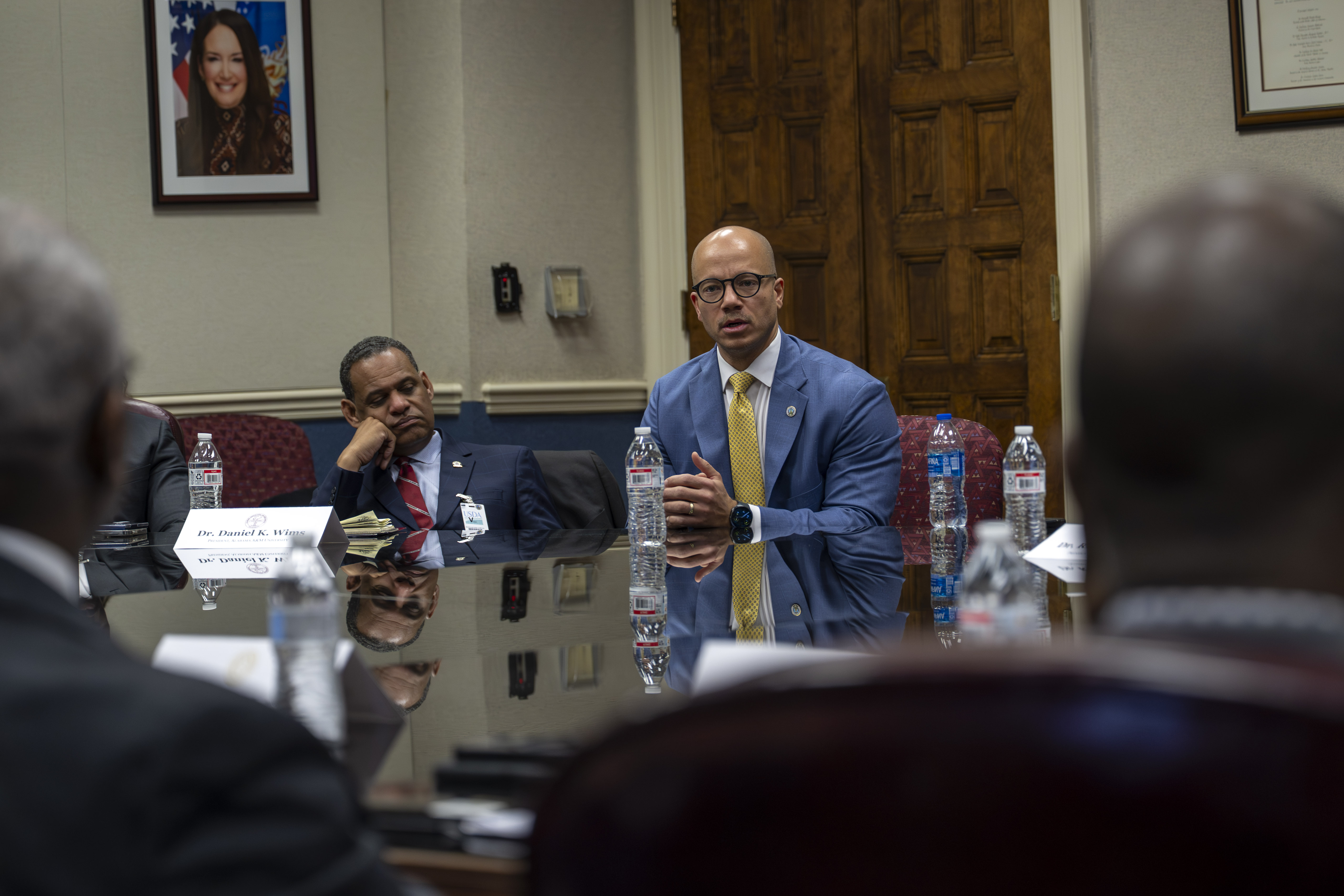

14th President of Virginia State University
- Incumbent
- Assumed office February 1, 2016

Personal details
- Born: Makola M. Abdullah Chicago, Illinois, U.S.
- Spouse: Ahkinyala Cobb-Abdullah
- Children: 2
- Education: Lake Forest Academy; Howard University; Northwestern University (PhD)

Makola M. Abdullah is the 14th president of Virginia State University (VSU). Prior to his appointment as president of Virginia State University, Abdullah served as provost and senior vice president at Bethune-Cookman University in Daytona Beach, Fla. (2013-2016), provost and vice president for academic affairs at Florida Memorial University in Miami Gardens, Fla. (2011-2013), and dean and director of 1890 land grant programs at Florida Agricultural and Mechanical University in Tallahassee, Fla (2008-2011).

== Early life and education ==
Abdullah is a Chicago native, graduating from Lake Forest Academy in 1986 where he also served as a school trustee. He earned his undergraduate degree from Howard University in civil engineering and his doctorate and master's degrees in civil engineering from Northwestern University. He is the youngest African American to receive a Ph.D. in engineering.

== Career ==
Abdullah served as dean and director of 1890 Land Grant Programs in the FAMU College of Engineering Sciences, Technology and Agriculture from 2008 to 2011. Prior to this appointment, Abdullah served as associate vice president for research.

From 2011 to 2013, Abdullah served as Florida Memorial's chief academic officer, overseeing all academic, research, and institutional effectiveness programs while also leading the strategic planning and Southern Association of Colleges and Schools (SACS) reaffirmation efforts.

Abdullah began his leadership as provost and senior vice president at Bethune-Cookman in July 2013. Over a three-year tenure, he oversaw the establishment of the college of undergraduate studies to centralize all academic support units on campus.

In July 2017, Abdullah was named the 'Male President of the Year' during the annual HBCU Awards. The following year, the institution earned the honor for 'HBCU of the Year.' Over the past five years, state appropriations to the university have increased by more than 30%, and research expenditures and fundraising have increased by 20%.

Virginia State ranked as the No. 19 historically Black college or university on the 2019 U.S. News & World Report's Best Colleges rankings and created a new initiative to provide free tuition for an estimated 300 Pell eligible, first-time freshmen from area high schools.

== Personal ==
Abdullah is a member of Alpha Phi Alpha fraternity. He and his wife, Ahkinyala Cobb-Abdullah have two children. In March 2021, Abdullah gained national attention for a viral video in which he faked out a fellow student in basketball. A follow-up video showed Abdullah defeating the same student in a three-point shooting contest in the VSU gym a few weeks later.
