= Charles Gelatt =

American businessman

Charles D. Gelatt (January 4, 1918 – August 9, 2014) was a businessman and philanthropist.

== Personal life ==
Gelatt was born in La Crosse, Wisconsin. He attended Central High School, then Lake Forest Academy before matriculating into University of Wisconsin–Madison, graduating in 1939. In 1947, he became the youngest person ever elected to the University of Wisconsin Board of Regents.

== Business ventures ==
He became a leader in the family business, Northern Engraving Corporation, during World War II.

He served on the board of trustees of the Northwestern Mutual Life Insurance Company for 28 years. From 1945 to 1962 and later in the 1960s, he served on the board of directors for the Miami Beach First National Bank.

He became an original part-owner of the Milwaukee Brewers baseball team and was an original investor in the La Crosse Catbirds of the Continental Basketball Association.

He founded numerous companies, including MicroCard—which he sold to National Cash Register in 1967—and Northern Micrographics.

== Philanthropic endeavors ==
He donated extensively to organizations in and around La Crosse, including the Franciscan Skemp Medical Center and Viterbo University (he also served on the school's board of directors). His donations tallied in the millions of dollars, including a $2 million gift to the Gundersen Lutheran Medical Center.
