= Ralph Bogan =

American businessman

Ralph A.L. Bogan Jr. (October 31, 1922 – June 9, 2013) was a businessman who co-owned the Milwaukee/Atlanta Braves in the 1960s and 1970s. He was a partner in the group that purchased the team in 1962.

He also worked for the Greyhound Bus company – where his father, Ralph Bogan Sr., was a high-ranking executive – was a private equity investor, and CEO of National Security Bank in Chicago.,/Treasurer of the One-Hundred Club of Chicago Police Department 1973–2013.

== Personal life ==
Ralph Alcott Lester Bogan Jr. was born in Hibbing, Minnesota. He attended Evanston Township High School, Choate Rosemary Hall and Lake Forest Academy, then Dartmouth College and the University of Pennsylvania. He served on a destroyer in the Navy during World War II. He died in Lincoln Park, Chicago. Bogan married Peggy Wickman April 2, 1953, Evanston, IL.First Presbyterian Church. Four daughters:Pamela Bogan, Sandra Rodin Bogan, Karen Ann Bogan Nelson, DIane Leigh Bogan Palermo. Granddaiughter Amanda Marie Bogan, born January 21, 1991.
