= Virginia State University =

Historically black university in Ettrick, Virginia, US

- Former names: Virginia Normal and Collegiate Institute (1882–1902); Virginia State College for Negroes (1902–1946); Virginia State College (1946–1979)
- Motto: "Greater Happens Here"
- Type: Public historically black land-grant university
- Established: March 6, 1882; 144 years ago
- Accreditation: SACS
- Academic affiliations: ORAU; SCHEV; TMCF; VHTP
- Endowment: $105.6 million (2025)
- President: Makola M. Abdullah
- Faculty: 300
- Students: 5,701 (Fall 2024)
- Location: Ettrick, Virginia, United States
- Campus: 236 acres (0.96 km^{2}); Large suburb
- Newspaper: The Statesman
- Colors: Orange and blue
- Nickname: Trojans
- Sporting affiliations: NCAA Division II – CIAA
- Website: vsu.edu
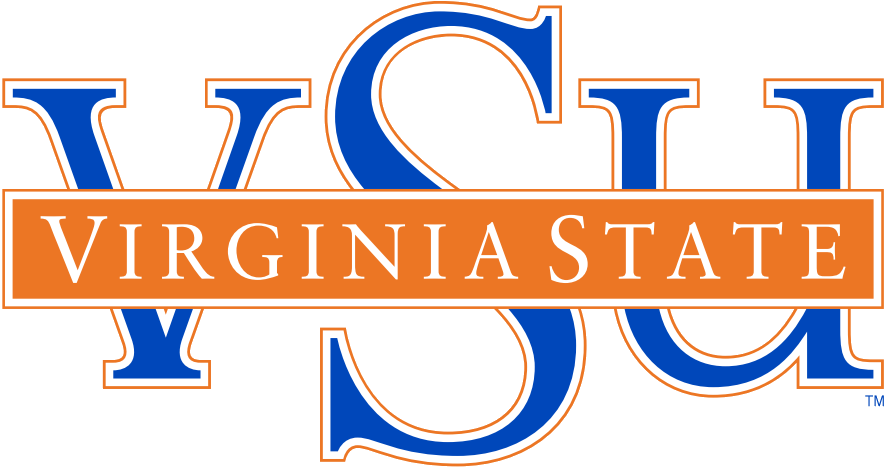

Virginia State University (VSU or Virginia State) is a public historically Black land-grant university in Ettrick and Colonial Heights, Virginia, United States. Founded on March 6, 1882, Virginia State developed as the United States's first fully state-supported four-year institution of higher learning for Black Americans. The university is a member school of the Thurgood Marshall College Fund.

== History ==
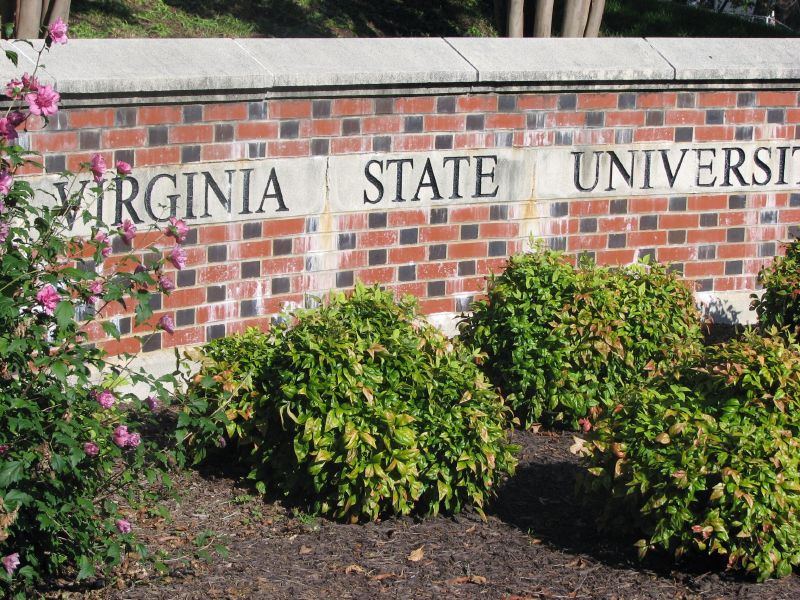
University entrance

Virginia State University was founded on March 6, 1882, when the legislature passed a bill to charter the Virginia Normal and Collegiate Institute. The bill was sponsored by Delegate Alfred W. Harris, a Black attorney whose offices were in Petersburg, but who lived in and represented Dinwiddie County in the General Assembly. A hostile lawsuit delayed opening day for nineteen months, until October 1, 1883. In 1902, the legislature revised the charter act to curtail the collegiate program and to change the name to Virginia Normal and Industrial Institute.

In 1920, the land-grant program for Black students was moved from a private school, Hampton Institute, where it had been since 1872, to Virginia Normal and Industrial Institute. In 1923 the college program was restored, and the name was changed to Virginia State College for Negroes in 1930. The two-year branch in Norfolk was added to the college in 1944; the Norfolk division became a four-year branch in 1956 and gained independence as Norfolk State College in 1969. Meanwhile, the parent school was renamed Virginia State College in 1946. The legislature passed a law in 1979 that changed the name to Virginia State University.

In the first academic year, 1883–1884, the university had 126 students and seven faculty (all of them Black), one building, 33 acres (13 ha), a 200-book library, and a $20,000 budget. By the centennial year of 1982, the university was fully integrated, with a student body of nearly 5,000, a full-time faculty of about 250, a library containing 200,000 books and 360,000 microform and non-print items, a 236-acre (96 ha) campus and 416-acre (168 ha) farm, more than 50 buildings, including 15 dormitories and 16 classroom buildings, and a biennial budget of $31,000,000, exclusive of capital outlay.

The university is situated in Chesterfield County at Ettrick, on a bluff across the Appomattox River from the city of Petersburg. It is accessible via Interstate Highways 95 and 85, which meet in Petersburg.

The first person to bear the title of President, John Mercer Langston, was one of the best-known Black men of his day. Until 1992, he was the only Black man ever elected to the United States Congress from Virginia (elected in 1888), and he was the great-uncle of the famed writer Langston Hughes. From 1888 to 1968, four presidents – James H. Johnston, John M. Gandy, Luther H. Foster, Robert P. Daniel served an average of 20 years, helping the school to overcome adversity and move forward. The next twenty years, 1968–1992, saw six more presidents—James F. Tucker, Wendell P. Russell, Walker H. Quarles, Jr., Thomas M. Law, Wilbert Greenfield, and Wesley Cornelious McClure. On June 1, 1993, Eddie N. Moore, Jr., the former Treasurer of the Commonwealth of Virginia, became the twelfth President of Virginia State University. Dr. Keith T. Miller became Virginia State University's 13th president from 2010 to 2014. In 2015, Dr. Pamela V. Hammond became the first woman to lead Virginia State University in 133 years. She was appointed as interim president on January 1, 2015. On February 1, 2016, President Makola Abdullah, Ph.D., was named as the 14th president of Virginia State University. Dr. Abdullah previously served as provost and senior vice president at Bethune-Cookman University in Daytona Beach, Fla. President Abdullah is a Chicago native who is the youngest African American to receive a Ph.D. in engineering. He earned his undergraduate degree from Howard University in civil engineering and a Master of Science in civil engineering from Northwestern University.

In 2020, MacKenzie Scott donated $30 million to Virginia State. Her donation is the second largest single gift in Virginia State's history.

Also in October 2025, MacKenzie Scott donated an additional $50 million to Virginia State which is the largest single gift in Virginia State's history. On August 15th, 2026, there was a shooting that injured 5 people.

== Main campus ==
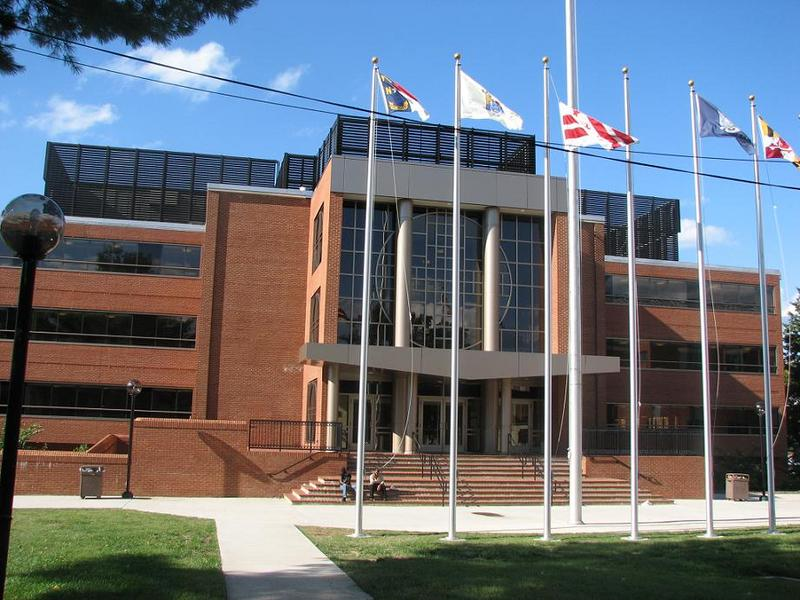
Library

The university has a 236-acre (0.96 km^{2}) main campus and a 412-acre (1.67 km^{2}) agricultural research facility known as the Randolph Farm. The main campus includes more than 50 buildings, including 11 dormitories and 18 academic buildings. The main campus is located close to the Appomattox River in Ettrick, Virginia.

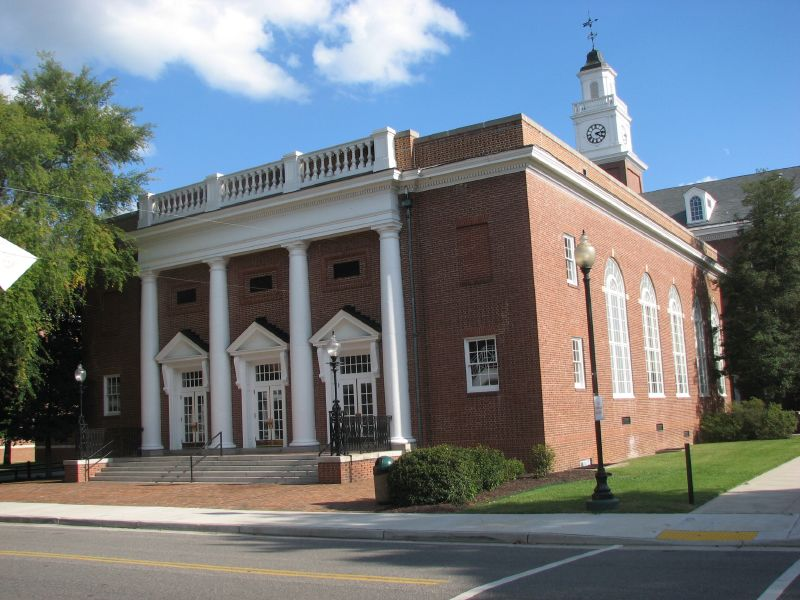
Campus 2006

== Residence halls ==
- Byrd Hall
- Branch Hall
- Howard Hall
- Campbell Hall
- Gateway 2
- Langston Hall
- Moore Hall
- Quad Hall (buildings I&II)
- Seward Hall
- Whiting Hall
- Williams Hall
- Magnolia Hall
- University Apartments (off-campus)

== Academics ==
Academics at the university are organized into seven colleges:

- College of Agriculture
- Reginald F. Lewis College of Business
- College of Education
- College of Engineering and Technology
- College of Graduate Studies, Research, and Outreach
- College of Humanities and Social Sciences
- College of Natural Sciences

== Demographics ==
Undergraduate demographics as of Fall 2023
Race and ethnicity	Total
Black	93%
Unknown	3%
White	3%
International student	1%
Economic diversity
Low-income (Note: The percentage of students who received an income-based federal Pell grant intended for low-income students.)	70%
Affluent (Note: The percentage of students who are a part of the American middle class at the bare minimum.)	30%

The 2017–2018 student body was 57.4% female and 43% male. It consists of 69.7% in-state and 30.3% out-of-state students. 97.2% of students live on campus and 2.8% off-campus. 91.1% of students self-identify as Black/African American, while 4.0% are White, and 4.0% are racially unreported.

== Athletics ==
Virginia State has 14 Division II athletic teams on campus and is a member of the Central Intercollegiate Athletic Association (CIAA) conference.

== Student activities ==
There are over 70 student organizations on campus, including the Student Government Association and National Pan-Hellenic Council.

=== Marching band ===
The Virginia State University Trojan Explosion is composed of instrumentalists, Essence of Troy Dancers, Satin Divas Flag, and Troy Elegance Twirlers.

The "Marching 110" was built during the leadership of F. Nathaniel Pops Gatlin and Claiborne T. Richardson. In 1984 the marching band was renamed the "Trojan Explosion" under the direction of Harold J. Haughton, Sr. and the music department began to grow. In 2013, Professor James Holden, Jr. became director of bands. In addition to serving as director of the VSU Gospel Chorale, Holden has served as assistant director of bands since 1984. The Trojan Explosion has been selected to attend the Honda Battle of the Bands 9 consecutive years. In addition to numerous accolades and achievements, the drum line performed at the White House for President Barack Obama during the signing of the HBCU Funding Bill.

=== Cheerleading ===
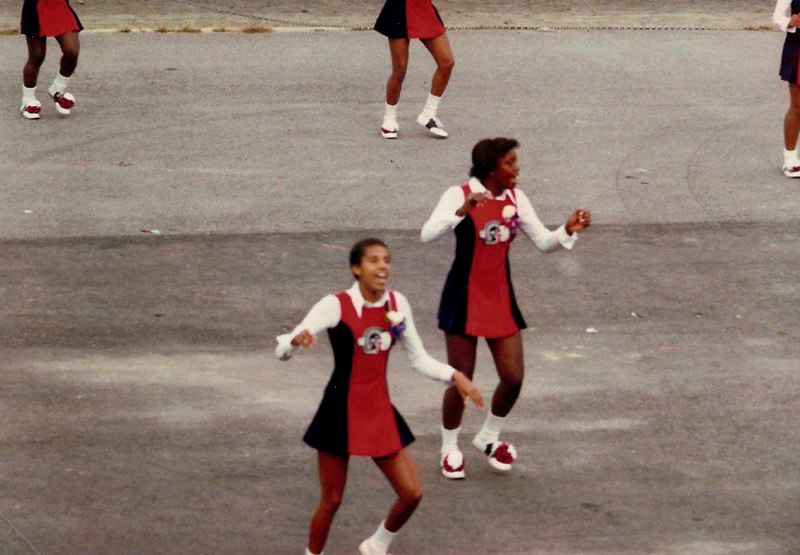
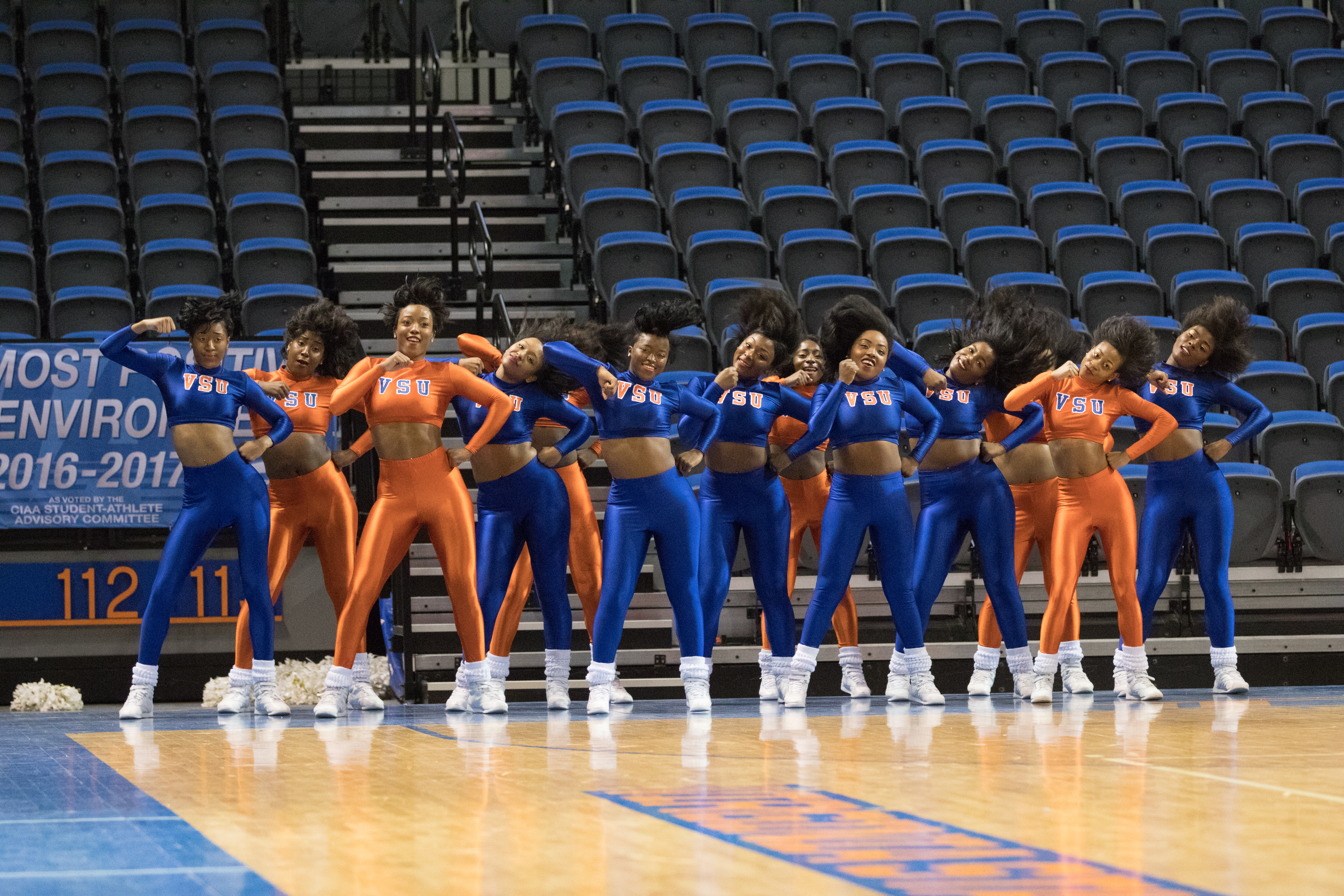
The Woo Woos in 1977 (left) and in 2017

Originally led by head coach Paulette Johnson, for 35 years, the Woo Woos are a nationally recognized cheerleading squad known for original, up-tempo and high energy performances. The 30 member squad is composed of young women from all over the country. The squad focuses on community service as well as promoting school spirit. Tryouts are held annually during the spring semester for VSU full-time students. Instructional camps and workshops are offered throughout the state.

In 2001, the university granted the Woo Woo Alumni chapter its initial charter. The organization has a rapidly growing membership that is actively involved in the promotion of the squad and its individual members. Shandra Claiborne, a former Woo Woo, led the team for one year following the retirement of Johnson. The squad has been under the leadership of former Woo Woo Cassandra Artis-Williams since 2013.

=== Concert choir ===
The Department of Music had a recording Concert Choir. In 1974, the choir recorded an album entitled The Undine Smith Moore Song Book, a recording in the series of Afro-American heritage in songs. This recording was third in the series, which aspired to produce a recording each year of the works of this Black composer who was a former faculty member and co-director of the Black Man in American Music Center. The choir also performed selections from this series in Baltimore at Bethel AME Church, "including songs from a group of gospel selections arranged by VSC students Larry Bland, Janet Coleman, and Roger Holliman." Several graduates of VSC were living in Baltimore, and came to join the choir at the end of the program as they sang the Evening Song.

== Notable people ==
=== Alumni ===
This list includes graduates, non-graduate former students and current students of Virginia State University.

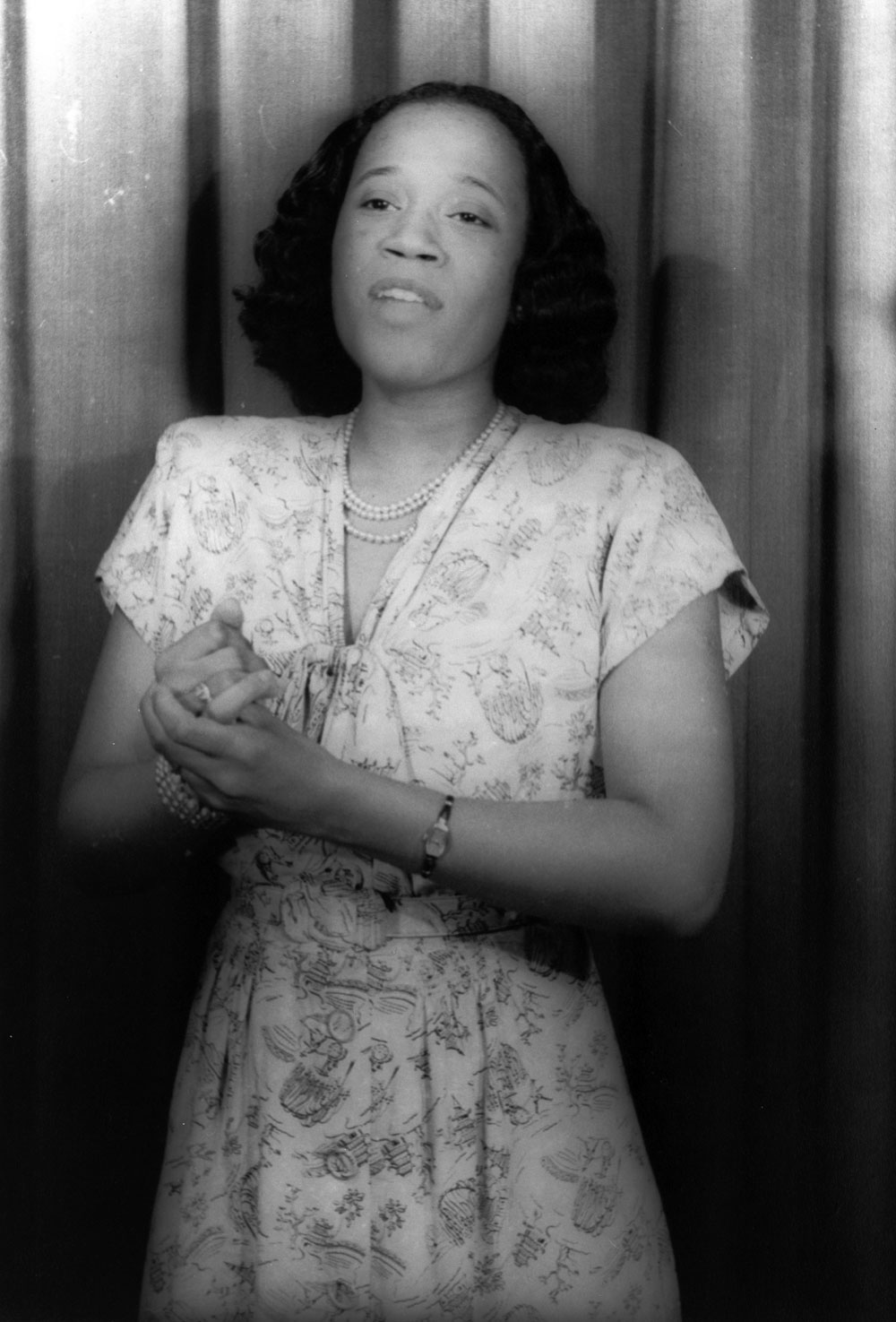
Alumna Camilla Williams, the first African American to get a contract from a major American opera company (namesake of Taylor-Williams Hall at the university)

Name	Class year	Notability	Reference(s)
Gaye Adegbalola	1978	Blues singer and civil rights activist	
James Avery		Actor	
Deshauna Barber	2011	Miss USA 2016, Top 9 in Miss Universe 2016	
Clara Byrd Baker		Educator, civic leader, and suffragist	
Aline Elizabeth Black		Educator and the focus of a civil rights suit	
Joe Bonner		Jazz pianist	
Matilda Booker	1911	American educator and administrator	
Herman Branson	1936	African American physicist, best known for his research on the alpha helix protein structure	
Rovenia M. Brock		Nutritionist, lecturer, health reporter, entrepreneur, and author	
Al Bumbry		Major League Baseball	
Larry Brooks	1971	Former NFL defensive lineman for the Los Angeles Rams and current assistant coach of the Virginia State Trojans football team	
James Brown		Former NFL player	
Pamela E. Bridgewater		Former U.S. Ambassador to Ghana and current U.S. ambassador to Jamaica	
Trenton Cannon	2017	NFL running back for the New York Jets	
Rufus Crawford		Former NFL and CFL player	
James H. Coleman, Jr.	1956	first African American justice of the New Jersey Supreme Court, retired	
Dorothy Cotton		Top Aide to Martin Luther King Jr., later serving as aide for the Southern Christian Leadership Conference aide Dorothy Cotton	
Daryl Cumber Dance	1957, 1963	American Folklorist, Author, and Professor	
Rosalyn Dance	1986	Politician, Member of the Virginia House of Delegates from the 63rd district	
Das EFX	attended	Hip-hop group	
Silas DeMary	1993	Arena Football League player	
Wale Folarin		DC Rapper (transferred to Bowie State University)	
Roger L. Gregory	1975	Judge, United States Court of Appeals for the Fourth Circuit	
Aaron Hall	attended	Member of the Music Group Guy	
Damion Hall	attended	Member of the Music Group Guy	
Otelia Shields Howard	attended	English instructor at VSC from 1921 to 1945	
ABilly S. Jones-Hennin	1967	LGBT rights activist and organizer	
Delores G. Kelley	1956	Member of Maryland State Senate, representing Maryland's District 10 in Baltimore County, Maryland	
Kelvin Kinney		Former NFL player	
Reginald F. Lewis	1965	Businessman; owner of TLC Beatrice International	
William H. Lewis	c. 1890	Former United States Assistant Attorney General	
Naomi Long Madgett	1945	Teacher and an award winning poet, she is also the senior editor of Lotus Press, which is a publisher of poetry books by African-American poets	
Lucy McBath	1982	U.S. Congresswoman from Georgia	
Amaza Lee Meredith	c. 1926	One of the nation's first Black female architects (International Style).	
Thomas Miller		Prolific graphic designer and visual artist, whose best known publicly accessible work is the collection of mosaics of the founders of DuSable Museum of African American History in Chicago, Illinois.	
Héctor Martínez Muñoz		First member of the Supreme Court of Puerto Rico	
Jim Mitchell		Former NFL player	
Dr. Regenia A. Perry	1961	One of the first African American women to earn a Ph.D. in art history	
Ora Brown Stokes Perry	1900	clubwoman, community organizer in Richmond	
Al Stewart	1990	Acting Secretary of labor under Joe Biden, Deputy Director of Labor	
James H. Stith	1963	African-American physicist and current professor of Physics at Ohio State University	
Roslyn Tyler		Politician, Member of the Virginia House of Delegates from the 75th district	
Billy Taylor	1942	Jazz musician	
Dennis L. Via	1980	Four star general, U.S. Army, Retired, 18th Commanding General United States Army Materiel Command (AMC)	
Gladys West	1952 (BS), 1955 (MS)	A mathematician whose work is credited to the development of the Global Positioning System (GPS). Inducted into the United States Air Force Hall of Fame	
Ken Whitlock	1947	CFL player, first Black player for the Toronto Argonauts	
Camilla Williams	1941	First African-American to receive a contract from a major American opera company	
Benjie E. Wimberly		Member of the New Jersey General Assembly	
Avis Wyatt	2007?	Professional basketball player	

== See also ==
- Dovell Act
