= Harrison B. Wilson =

Second President of Norfolk State University
- In office 1975–1997
- Preceded by: Lyman Beecher Brooks
- Succeeded by: Marie V. McDemmond

Personal details
- Born: Harrison Benjamin Wilson Jr. April 21, 1925 Amsterdam, New York, U.S.
- Died: July 28, 2019 (aged 94)
- Spouse(s): Anna Williams (died 1967); Lucy Cutliff
- Children: Benjamin F. Wilson Harrison B. Wilson III John R. Wilson Richard A. Wilson Jennifer C. Wilson M. April Woodard, née Wilson
- Relatives: Russell Wilson (grandson); Anna Wilson (granddaughter)
- Education: Kentucky State University (B.A.); Indiana University Bloomington (M.A., Ph.D.)
- Profession: Educator; Professor; Coach

Harrison Benjamin Wilson Jr. (April 21, 1925 – July 28, 2019) was an American health educator and college basketball coach who served as the second president of Norfolk State University from 1975 to 1997.

== Early life ==
Wilson was born on April 21, 1925, in Amsterdam, New York, the son of Marguerite (Ayers) and Harrison Benjamin Wilson Sr. After serving in the United States Navy from 1945 to 1947, he enrolled at the Kentucky State College for Negroes (now Kentucky State University) and received his B.S. degree, was an honor student and became a star athlete in basketball, football, baseball, and track.

== Career ==
Wilson was the head basketball coach at the Jackson College for Negro Teachers (now Jackson State University) from 1950 to 1967 and had a cumulative 342–88 record. At Jackson College, he was also chair of the Department of Health and Physical Education from 1960 to 1967. In the early 1950s, Wilson enrolled at Indiana University Bloomington, where he completed a master's degree in physical education and Ph.D. in health science and administration.

He retired in 1997. The NSU administrative building was named in his honor. Dr. Wilson was honored by Old Dominion as one of their Strong Men and Women Excellence leadership series shortly after retiring from NSU in 1997.

== Personal life ==
Wilson married first wife, Anna Williams, who died in 1967 due to complications from surgery. Wilson later married Lucy Cutliff, a former faculty member at Old Dominion University and a former Norfolk Public Schools Board member. He was the father of six children. His grandson Russell Wilson is a Super Bowl-winning quarterback. Russell's sister and Harrison's granddaughter Anna Wilson led Stanford to the 2022 NCAA Final Four.

Wilson was active in a number of boards and organizations. Wilson was initiated at the Alpha Upsilon chapter of Kappa Alpha Psi fraternity at Kentucky State University and was a member of the Alpha Kappa Mu honor society.

Wilson died on July 28, 2019.

== Legacy ==
Norfolk State University's administrative building at the corner of Brambleton and Park Avenues in Downtown Norfolk was named in his honor.
