= Lindsay Glazer =

American stand-up comedian and actress

Lindsay Rachel Glazer also known as The Alphabitch is an American stand-up comedian, and actress.

== Career ==
Glazer started her career as a criminal-defense attorney in South Florida and later became a stand-up comedian with the stage name "The Alphabitch."

Glazer performed stand-up or appeared as a guest on or as an actress on Justice for All with Judge Cristina Perez, (2019) Comedy Doctors (2020), & Meaningless Debate (2020).

Glazer's first album “Thanks, Dad.” was recorded with Comedy Dynamics at Wiseguys Comedy Club in Las Vegas and released on April 14, 2023.

Glazer won at the US Comedy Contest in 2019 and she is on Comedy Central's Sit N' Spin.

Glazer is from Peoria, Illinois. She is the daughter of Jay Glazer, former owner of Peoria Heights-based Super Liquors. She graduated from Lake Forest Academy and attended Indiana University. From there she attended Tulane University Law School.

== Lawsuit ==
In 2019, Scottie Pippen filed suit against Glazer, her 5 year old daughter, and her ex-husband, Jacob Woloshin, related to the destruction of the mansion they rented for 7 months for $30,000/m after their primary residence was damaged by Hurricane Irma, which was later disputed by them and was later settled. The lawsuit also alleged that Pippen's knife set was missing for which Lindsay set up a GoFundMe page to replace Pippen's knife set. The page raised $31 instead of an initial objective goal of $14.

== Filmography ==
- Sex Life (2021)
- Comedy Doctors (2021)
- Meaningless Debate (2019)
- Justice for All with Judge Cristina Perez (2019)
