= Edward Everett Nourse =

Edward Everett Nourse, D.D. (December 24, 1863 – April 30, 1929) was an American Congregational theologian.

Nourse was born at Bayfield, Wisconsin. He studied at the College and the Academy at Lake Forest, Illinois, at Macalester College in Minnesota, Hartford Theological Seminary (1891), and in Europe at the University of Jena (1894-95. He was ordained to the Presbyterian ministry in 1893. He served as a pastor at Berlin, Connecticut (1895–98) and afterward at Hartford Theological Seminary, advancing to professor of biblical theology after 1905. He died on April 30, 1929, in West Hartford, Connecticut.

== Works ==
- The Standard Bible Dictionary. New York & London: Funk and Wagnalls, 1909.
- Selected Epistles of Paul (1911), republished as Selected Epistles of Paul (1915).
