= Sports in Norfolk, Virginia =

There are several professional minor-league sports teams as well as college sports teams in the Norfolk, Virginia area.

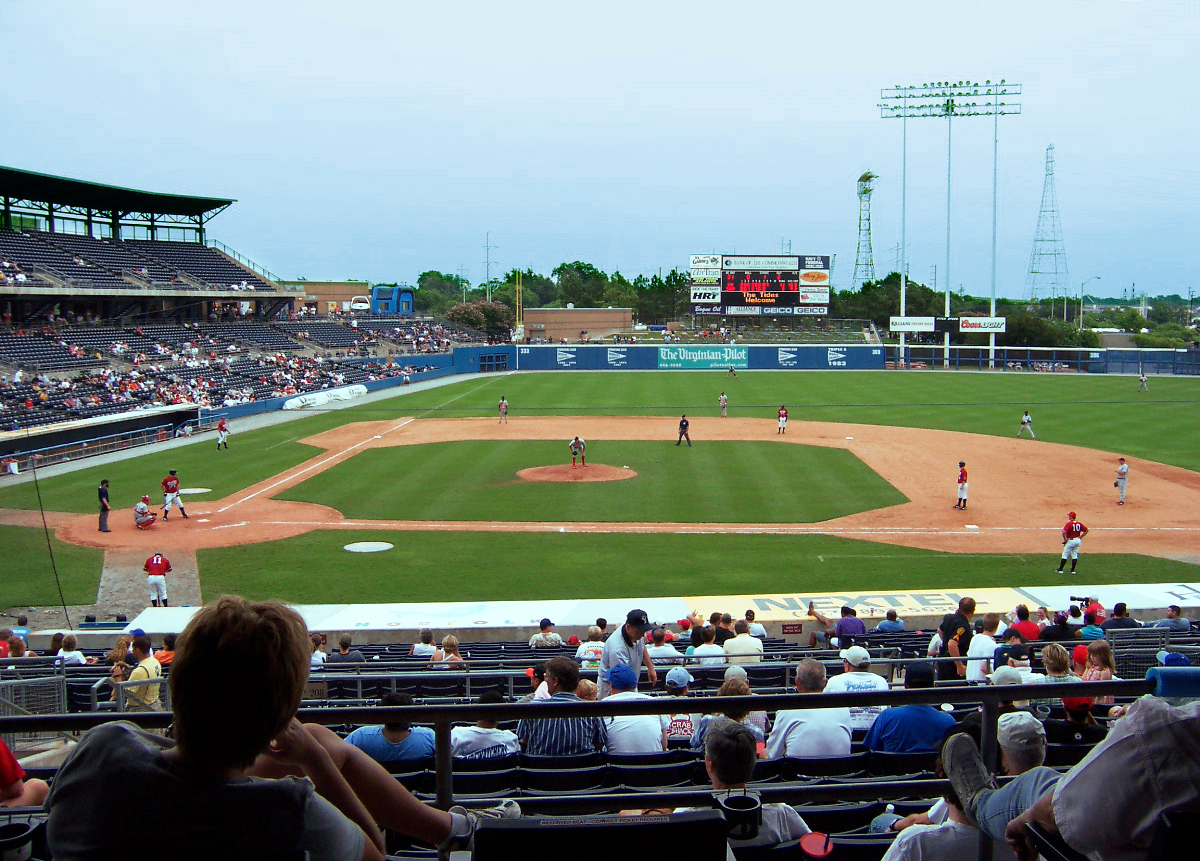
Harbor Park

== Teams ==
| Team | Sport | League | Venue | Attendance |
|---|---|---|---|---|
| Norfolk Tides | Baseball | International League (AAA) | Harbor Park | 5,703 |
| Norfolk Admirals | Ice hockey | ECHL | Norfolk Scope | 5,004 |
| Old Dominion Monarchs | Football | Sun Belt Conference | S.B. Ballard Stadium | 21,944 |
| Old Dominion Monarchs | Basketball | Sun Belt Conference | Chartway Arena | 8,472 |
| Norfolk State Spartans | Football | Mid-Eastern Athletic Conference | William "Dick" Price Stadium | 8,174 |
| Norfolk State Spartans | Basketball | Mid-Eastern Athletic Conference | Echols Hall | 4,500 |

== Baseball ==
In April 1993, the 12,067-seat Harbor Park baseball stadium opened, hosting the Norfolk Tides Triple-A minor league baseball team. It received the honor of best minor league park in 1995 by Baseball America.

== Basketball ==
From 1970 to 1976, Norfolk served as home court (along with Hampton, Richmond and Roanoke) for the Virginia Squires regional professional basketball franchise of the now-defunct American Basketball Association (ABA). From 1970 to 1971, the Squires played their Norfolk home games at the Old Dominion University Fieldhouse. In November 1971, the Virginia Squires played their Norfolk home games at the new Norfolk Scope arena, until the team and the ABA league folded in May 1976.

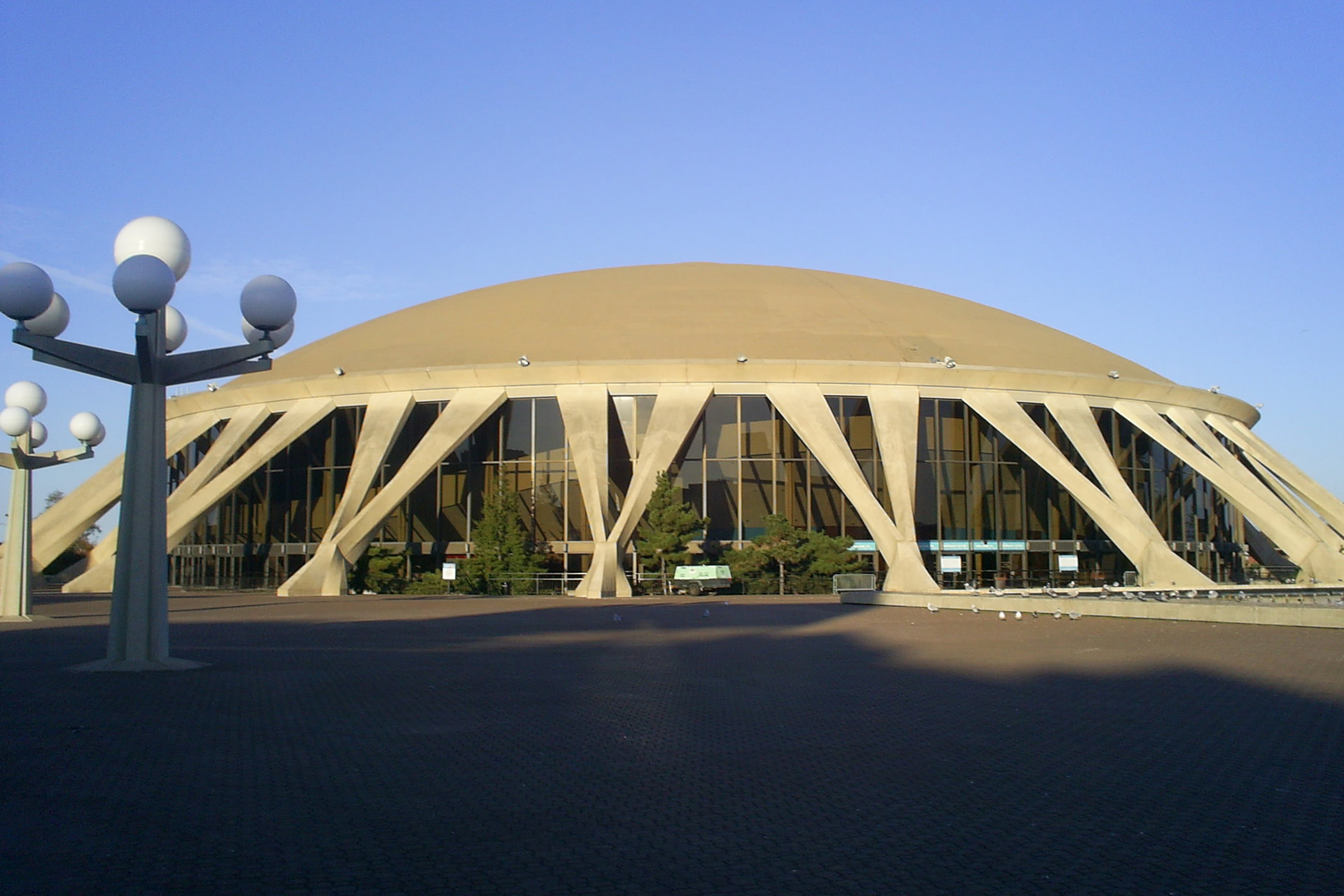
The Norfolk Scope

On January 30, 1974, the city hosted its first professional basketball all-star game, courtesy of the American Basketball Association, at the Norfolk Scope. 10,624 spectators were in attendance, as Artis Gilmore won Most Valuable Player of the 1974 ABA All-Star Game.

== Ice hockey ==
In 1997, the National Hockey League rejected a bid for the proposed Hampton Roads Rhinos to enter the league as an expansion franchise.

The former Hampton Roads Admirals won three championships in the ECHL while it played from 1989 until 2000. The Admirals' ownership then acquired an expansion franchise in the American Hockey League and called it the Norfolk Admirals. In 2015, the AHL Admirals were purchased and relocated. Norfolk would then receive another ECHL team that would share that same name for the 2015–16 season.

== College sports ==
Old Dominion Monarchs and the Norfolk State Spartans play in NCAA Division I while the Virginia Wesleyan College's Marlins play in NCAA Division III.

On March 29, 1982, Norfolk hosted the first NCAA Women's Division I Basketball Championship (also known as the Women's Final Four). The Norfolk Scope served as the chief venue for the event. 9,531 spectators were in attendance at this inaugural event. On April 3, 1983, Norfolk hosted the second NCAA Women's Division I Basketball Championship at the Norfolk Scope. 7,837 spectators were in attendance.

== Professional wrestling ==
The Norfolk Scope has served as the site of many professional wrestling events, including Total Nonstop Action Wrestling's Destination X and World Championship Wrestling's World War III. Norfolk Scope was also the site of an episode of WCW Monday Nitro, where several World Wrestling Federation wrestlers drove a tank to the entryway of the Scope, thus "invading" the competition.

== Venues ==
In 1971, Norfolk built the region's first entertainment and sports complex, featuring Chrysler Hall and the 13,800-seat Norfolk Scope indoor arena, located in the northern section of downtown. Norfolk Scope has served as a venue for major events.
