= Samuel Fischer Scott =

American educator and first director of Norfolk Unit

Director of Norfolk Unit of Virginia Union University
- In office 1935–1938
- Succeeded by: Lyman Beecher Brooks

Personal details
- Born: 1907
- Died: May 31, 1988
- Spouse: Albanie Roslyn Joyner Scott
- Education: University of Michigan (M.A.); Virginia Union University (B.A.)
- Profession: Professor; Social Worker

Samuel Fischer Scott (1907–1988) was an African-American educator. He was the first director of the Norfolk Unit of Virginia Union University established in 1935 and located in downtown Norfolk, Virginia. He led the Norfolk unit as director from September 1935 to summer of 1938.

== Early life and education ==
Scott was a born in 1907 and native of Portsmouth, Virginia. Scott received his Bachelor of Arts degree from Virginia Union University in 1931 and his master's from the University of Michigan in 1933.

== Career ==
During a visit to Virginia Union in the summer of 1935 he was asked by officials to lead a school in Norfolk. At the time of his appointment as Director of the Norfolk Unit of Virginia Union University in 1935, he was a social worker serving on the staff of the Emergency Relief Bureau in New York City; he served until 1938.

His primary concern was keeping the school solvent. He also actively recruited students from churches, schools, homes and various places they could be found for the benefit of the school.

In 1984 Norfolk State University's Board of Visitors named a new men's dormitory in his honor. Virginia Union University awarded him the honorary degree of Doctor of Humane Letters in May 1987.
