= Marie McDemmond =

American academic (1946–2022)

Marie Valentine McDemmond

President of Norfolk State University
- In office 1997–2005
- Preceded by: Harrison Wilson Jr.
- Succeeded by: Carolyn Meyers; Alvin J. Schexnider (interim)

Personal details
- Born: 1946
- Died: July 27, 2022
- Children: 2 children
- Education: University of Massachusetts at Amherst (Ed.D.); University of New Orleans (M.A.); Xavier University (B.A.)
- Profession: professor university administrator

Dr. Marie Valentine McDemmond (1946 – July 27, 2022) was an American educator. She became the third president of Norfolk State University, the first woman to serve in that role. She also became the first African-American woman to serve as the head of a four-year college in Virginia. She served as president from 1997 to 2005, when she retired. Dr. Alvin J. Schexnider became acting president from July 2005 until June 30, 2006.

McDemmond became the first African-American woman president of the Southern Association of College and University Business Officers (SACUBO).
