= Tony Atwater =

American academic administrator

President of Norfolk State University
- In office 2011–2013
- Preceded by: Carolyn Meyers

President of Indiana University of Pennsylvania
- In office 2005–2010

Personal details
- Education: Virginia Western Community College; Hampton University; Virginia Polytechnic Institute and State University; Michigan State University; University of Michigan; Harvard Graduate School of Education

Tony K. Atwater, is the former president of Norfolk State University.

== Education ==
Atwater holds a 1972 A.S.S. in television and radio production from Virginia Western Community College. He graduated from Hampton University with a BA, magna cum laude in 1973. Entering graduate school at Virginia Polytechnic Institute and State University he was awarded an MA in education in 1979. He then earned a Ph.D. in communication research from Michigan State University in 1983. His dissertation was titled: A Market Analysis of Content Diversity in Local Television News. He completed his postdoctoral study in the Department of Communication at the University of Michigan in 1989.

== Career ==
During his career he has served as the Dean of Professional Studies at Northern Kentucky University, Chair of the Department of Journalism and Mass Media at Rutgers University, and was Provost at Youngstown State University.

=== Indiana University of Pennsylvania ===
Dr. Atwater served as president of Indiana University of Pennsylvania, the largest member university of the Pennsylvania State System of Higher Education, from 2005 to 2010. During his tenure at IUP, he attempted to change the institution's "party-school" image. The university also continued an ambitious residential hall construction project under Atwater's leadership.

In December 2009, 84% of voting faculty members chose "no confidence" in Atwater as president. The vote was based on 31 specific complaints identified by the faculty union, including questionable use of university funds, poor leadership style, and poor decision-making. The vote of "no confidence" also included allegations of an "imperialistic leadership style."

Atwater resigned as president of IUP on June 30, 2010, to serve as a Senior Fellow at the American Association of State Colleges and Universities.

Since his departure as president, Atwater has continued to be the subject of news reports probing his spending practices at IUP.

=== Norfolk State University ===
Atwater was announced as Norfolk State's new president on April 22, 2011, by the NSU Board of Visitors. He officially became president of Norfolk State on July 1, 2011.

On August 23, 2013, Atwater was fired by the board of Norfolk State University.
