= Carolyn Meyers =

American university president

4th President of Norfolk State University
- In office 2006–2010
- Preceded by: Marie McDemmond
- Succeeded by: Tony Atwater

10th President of Jackson State University
- In office 2010–2016
- Preceded by: Ronald Mason Jr.
- Succeeded by: William B. Bynum

Personal details
- Born: Newport News, Virginia, U.S.
- Education: Howard University; Georgia Institute of Technology
- Institutions: General Electric; North Carolina Agricultural and Technical State University

Carolyn Winstead Meyers is the former president of Jackson State University. Meyers, a native of Newport News, Virginia, earned a bachelor's degree in mechanical engineering from Howard University. She earned a master's degree in mechanical engineering from the Georgia Tech in 1979, and a doctorate in chemical engineering from Georgia Tech in 1984. She completed post doctoral work at Harvard University.

== Early career ==
Meyers held the position of steam generator and systems analyst for General Electric. She has also held faculty and administrative positions at Georgia Institute of Technology, Atlanta University Center Corporation, and National Science Foundation.

She served as provost, vice chancellor for Academic Affairs and Dean of the College of Engineering at North Carolina Agricultural and Technical State University, where she was also a tenured professor in the College of Engineering. She was the Associate Dean of Research for the Georgia Tech College of Engineering.

== Later career ==
On February 3, 2006, Meyers was named as President of Norfolk State University, and she assumed her duties on July 1, 2006. As president, Meyers raised more funds than any previous president in the history of the institution, including an anonymous donation of $3.5 million just last year. Additionally, under her leadership, Norfolk conducted more research than at any other time in its history.

On November 3, 2009, Meyers was announced as one of three finalists as the president of Morgan State University. Meyers resigned her position as president of Norfolk effective June 30, 2010.

On November 22, 2010, Meyers was named as the next president of Jackson State University.

== Awards and honors ==
Meyers has been inducted into the Georgia Tech Academy of Distinguished Engineering Alumni, Sigma Xi honor society, Phi Kappa Phi honor society, and Tau Beta Pi honor society. She is also the recipient of the NSF Presidential Young Investigator Award, the Society of Automotive Engineers' Ralph A. Teetor Award, and the National Society of Black Engineers' Golden Torch Award.

She was named an ASME Fellow in 1993.

== Personal life ==
Meyers is the parent of three adult children and the grandmother of three.

Academic offices
Preceded by Marie V. McDemmond	President of Norfolk State University; 2006–2010	Succeeded by Tony Atwater
Preceded by Ronald Mason Jr.	President of Jackson State University; 2010–2016	Succeeded by William B. Bynum
