= Babe Frump =

American football player (1901–1979)

No. 17
- Position: Guard

Personal information
- Born: July 15, 1901; Ohio, U.S.
- Died: August 14, 1979 (aged 78); Boynton Beach, Florida, U.S.
- Listed height: 6 ft 0 in (1.83 m)
- Listed weight: 225 lb (102 kg)

Career information
- High school: Lake Forest Academy
- College: Ohio Wesleyan (1922–1925)

Career history
- Chicago Bears (1930)
- Stats at Pro Football Reference

Maurice Elwood "Babe" Frump (July 15, 1901 – August 14, 1979) was an American professional football guard who played one season in the National Football League (NFL) with the Chicago Bears. He played college football at Ohio Wesleyan University.

== Early life and college ==
Maurice Elwood Frump was born on July 15, 1901, in Ohio. He attended Hillsboro High School in Hillsboro, Ohio and Lake Forest Academy in Lake Forest, Illinois.

He was a member of the Ohio Wesleyan Battling Bishops of Ohio Wesleyan University from 1922 to 1925 and a three-year letterman from 1923 to 1925. The 1925 Battling Bishops were Ohio Athletic Conference champions.

== Professional career ==
Frump signed with the Chicago Bears of the National Football League in 1930. He played in nine games, starting eight at guard, for the Bears during the 1930 season. The Bears finished the year with a 9–4–1 record, good for third place in the NFL.

== Personal life ==
Frump died on August 14, 1979, in Boynton Beach, Florida at the age of 78.
