= Education in Norfolk, Virginia =

Norfolk, Virginia offers many educational opportunities. Schools, public and private, are located all over the city.

== Elementary, secondary ==
Norfolk Public Schools, the public school system, comprises 5 high schools, 9 middle schools, 35 elementary schools, and 9 special-purpose/preschools. In 2005, Norfolk Public Schools won the $1 million Broad Prize for Urban Education award for having demonstrated, "the greatest overall performance and improvement in student achievement while reducing achievement gaps for poor and minority students". The city had previously been nominated in 2003 and 2004.

There are also a number of private schools located in the city, the oldest of which, Norfolk Academy, was founded in 1728.

== Post-secondary ==
Norfolk is home to three public universities and one private. It also hosts a community college campus in downtown.

Universities and Colleges in Norfolk, Virginia
Institution	Foundation year	Notes
Old Dominion University	1930	Founded as a branch of The College of William & Mary
Old Dominion University	1930	Became an independent institution in 1962 and now offers degrees in 68 undergraduate and 95 (60 masters/35 doctoral) graduate degree programs.
Norfolk State University	1935	The country's fifth largest majority black university, offers degrees in a wide variety of liberal arts.
Virginia Wesleyan University	1961	Small private liberal arts college, shares its eastern border with the neighboring city of Virginia Beach.
Tidewater Community College	1968	Community college offering two-year degrees and specialized training programs, located in downtown.
Eastern Virginia Medical School	1973	Founded as a community medical school by the surrounding jurisdictions
Eastern Virginia Medical School	1973	Noted for its research into reproductive medicine and is located in the region's major medical complex in the Ghent District.
