= Virginia High-Tech Partnership =

The Virginia High-Tech Partnership (VHTP) is an educational consortium that links students from Virginia's five Historically Black Colleges and Universities with corporations, high-tech firms and government agencies for internships, summer positions and career opportunities.

== Participation ==
The following universities participate in the partnership:

- Hampton University
- Norfolk State University
- Saint Paul's College
- Virginia State University
- Virginia Union University

More than 3,000 students in these schools major in technology, mathematics and science degree programs.
