= Midwest Prep Hockey League =

Highly elite prep school ice hockey league in North America

Midwest Prep Hockey League
MPHL website
Founded	2000
Head Office	Pittsburgh, Pennsylvania
Most recent champions	Ridley College (3rd Title)
Most Championships	Shady Side Academy (13 Titles)
Statue	Prep School
Official Web site	MPHL
Commissioner	Lee Semplice

The Midwest Prep Hockey League (abbreviated MPHL) is a highly elite prep school ice hockey league in North America. The Midwest Prep League was founded in 2000; the original six league members were Culver Academies (IN), Gilmour Academy (OH), Lake Forest Academy (IL), Park Tudor School (IN), Shady Side Academy (PA), and St. Francis High School (NY). Since its inception the league has grown to ten Division 1 level prep school teams across the United States and Canada. The MPHL aids in preparing student athletes for college ice hockey and other higher levels of hockey. The league has maintained a competitive level of play throughout the USA and Canada, and has scheduled "Showcase" Weekends for scouts to see all the teams & players at one site. Many former MPHL players have gone on to play in NCAA college hockey at a variety of levels. The founders of the league were John Malloy (Gilmour Academy), Dave Erickson (Lake Forest Academy), Len Semplice (Shady Side Academy), and John Bowers (St. Francis HS).

Many MPHL players have gone on to compete in professional and college hockey.

Teams
King's Edgehill School
Bishop's College School
Gilmour Academy
Lake Forest Academy
Rice Memorial High School
Ridley College
Rothesay Netherwood School
Shady Side Academy
Stanstead College

== MPHL Alumni ==
A number of notable MPHL alumni have gone to play college, junior, and professional hockey.

=== MPHL Alumni Who Played/Worked in the NHL ===
- Steve Gainey - Dallas Stars/ St. Andrew's College
- Patrick Kaleta - Buffalo Sabres/ St. Francis High School
- Ryan Suter - Nashville Predators- U.S. Olympian/ Culver Military Academy
- Blake Geoffrion - Montreal Canadiens- U.S. Olympian/ Culver Military Academy
- Mark Jankowski - Calgary Flames/ Stanstead College
- Alex DeBrincat - Chicago Blackhawks/ Lake Forest Academy
- John Gilmour - Buffalo Sabres/ Gilmour Academy
- Noah Dobson - Bishop's College School
- Dawson Mercer - Bishop's College School

=== MPHL Schools Alumni Who played/ Worked in the NHL before league Started ===
- Kevin Dean - New Jersey Devils/ Culver Military Academy
- Greg Hotham - Pittsburgh Penguins/ St. Andrew's College
- Todd Krygier - Mighty Ducks of Anaheim / St. Francis High School
- John-Michael Liles - Boston Bruins- U.S. Olympian/ Culver Military Academy
- Aaron Miller - Vancouver Canucks- U.S. Olympian/ St. Francis High School
- Al Montoya - Montreal Canadiens / Loyola Academy
- Teddy Purcell - Los Angeles Kings/ Lake Forest Academy
- Lee Stempniak - Carolina Hurricanes / St. Francis High School
- Gary Suter - Calgary Flames, Chicago Blackhawks/ Culver Military Academy
- Mike Iggulden - New York Islanders / Ridley College
- Jere Gillis - Bishop's College School
- Edward Bronfman - Bishop's College School
- Hartland Molson/ Molson Family - Bishop's College School

== League Champions ==
2024-2025 RNS Prep

2023-2024 Gilmour Academy

2022-2023 ???

2021-2022 Bishop's College School

2019-2020 Ridley College

2018-2019 Ridley College

2017-2018 Ridley College

2016-2017 Lake Forest Academy

2015-2016 Ridley College

2014-2015 Ridley College

2012-2013 Edge School

2011-2012 Stanstead College

2010-2011 Edge School

2009-2010 St. Andrew's College

2008-2009 Lake Forest Academy

2007-2008 St. Andrew's College

2006-2007 St. Andrew's College

2005-2006 St. Francis High School

2004-2005 St. Andrew's College

2003-2004 National Sports Academy

2002-2003 Orchard Lake St. Mary's

2001-2002 Park Tudor School

2000-2001 Park Tudor School

== Award winners ==
Best GAA Dekon Randell-Snow

== See also ==
- List of ice hockey leagues
