= Samuel Scott (footballer) =

Scottish footballer

Personal information
- Full name: Samuel McCleary Scott
- Date of birth: 5 November 1873
- Place of birth: Port Glasgow, Scotland
- Date of death: 1938 (aged 64–65)
- Position: Full back

Senior career*
Years	Team	Apps	(Gls)
1895–1896	Port Glasgow Athletic		
1896–1898	Bolton Wanderers	19	(0)
1898–1899	Rangers		
1899–1900	Port Glasgow Athletic		
1901	Barrow		
1902	Port Glasgow Athletic		
Total		19	(0)
- * Club domestic league appearances and goals

Samuel McCleary Scott (5 November 1873 – 1938) was a Scottish footballer who played in the Football League for Bolton Wanderers.
