= Norfolk State University =

Public historically black university in Norfolk, Virginia, US

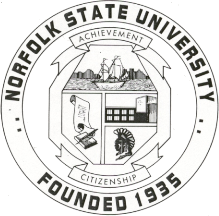
- Former names: Norfolk Division of Virginia Union University (1935–1942); Norfolk Polytechnic College (1942–1969); Norfolk State College (1969–1979)
- Motto: On seal: "Achievement, Citizenship" "We See the Future in You"
- Type: Public historically black university
- Established: September 18, 1935; 91 years ago
- Accreditation: SACS
- Academic affiliations: ORAU; SCHEV; TMCF; VHTP
- Endowment: $109.5 million (2025)
- President: Javaune Adams-Gaston
- Administrative staff: 589
- Students: 5,616 (Fall 2019)
- Undergraduates: 5,000 (Fall 2019)
- Postgraduates: 616 (Fall 2019)
- Location: Norfolk, Virginia, United States; 36°50′55″N 76°15′45″W
- Campus: 134 acres (0.54 km^{2}); Midsize city
- Newspaper: Spartan Echo
- Colors: Green and gold
- Nickname: Spartans
- Sporting affiliations: NCAA Division I FCS – MEAC; NEC
- Mascot: Spiro the Spartan
- Website: nsu.edu

Norfolk State University (NSU) is a public historically black university in Norfolk, Virginia. It is a member of the Thurgood Marshall College Fund and Virginia High-Tech Partnership.

== History ==
The institution was founded on September 18, 1935, as the Norfolk Unit of Virginia Union University. Eighty-five students attended the first classes held in 1935. Mr. Samuel Fischer Scott, an alumnus of Virginia Union and Portsmouth native, served as the first director with the primary focus of maintaining the solvency of the school. Dr. Lyman Beecher Brooks, a Virginia Union alumnus, succeeded Scott as director in 1938, and served as provost, 1963–1969, and the first president 1969–1975.

In 1942, the school became independent of VUU and was named Norfolk Polytechnic College. Within two years, by an act of the Virginia Legislature, it became a part of Virginia State College (now Virginia State University). By 1950, the 15th anniversary of the college founding, the faculty had grown to fifty and the student enrollment to 1,018. In 1952, the college's athletic teams adopted the "Spartan" name and identity.

The City of Norfolk provided a permanent site for the college on Corprew Avenue, and in 1955 Brown Hall, formerly Tidewater Hall, opened as the first permanent building on the new campus. In 1956 the future Norfolk State College granted its first bachelor's degrees.

In 1969, the college divided from Virginia State College and was named Norfolk State College. The college was issued accreditation from the Southern Association of Colleges and Schools the same year with an enrollment of 5,400 students. In 1975 and the year following, the first master's degrees were awarded in Communications and Social Work, respectively. Dr. Harrison Benjamin Wilson Jr., in 1975, succeeded Dr. Lyman Beecher Brooks as president after 37 years.

When the college was granted university status in 1979 by the General Assembly of Virginia, it changed its name to Norfolk State University.

Norfolk State University celebrated its 50th anniversary in 1985 with a year of observances and with an enrollment of 7,200. In 1995 Norfolk State University's enrollment reached 9,112.

Upon the retirement of Dr. Harrison Benjamin Wilson in 1997, Marie Valentine McDemmond became NSU's third President in 1997 and served until 2005 when she resigned due to poor health. Dr. McDemmond was the first woman president of the university. Alvin J. Schexnider became interim president in July 2005. Carolyn Meyers was selected as the fourth president and began service on July 1, 2006. Tony Atwater was announced as the new president in 2011, becoming the fifth president, and served until he was removed by the board of visitors of Norfolk State University on August 23, 2013. Sandra DeLoatch, the provost and president of academic affairs, was named acting president. On September 13, 2013, Eddie N. Moore Jr. was appointed interim president of Norfolk State University, and started serving in that capacity on September 23, 2013.

In December 2013, the university was placed on probation by its regional accreditor, the Southern Association of Colleges and Schools, for "financial and governance issues." The probation was lifted two years later.

Eddie Moore Jr. became the 6th president of Norfolk State University on January 10, 2016.

Upon President Moore announcing his retirement in late September 2017, the NSU board of visitors named Dr. Melvin Stith as interim president. He assumed office on January 1, 2018. On June 24, 2019, Dr. Javaune Adams-Gaston became the 7th president of Norfolk State University after moving from her job as senior vice president for student life at Ohio State University.

In 2020, Norfolk State received $40 million from philanthropist MacKenzie Scott, which is the second largest single gift in the school's history. In 2025, she donated an additional $50 million, which is the largest single gift in Norfolk State's history.

== Academics ==
The Commission on Colleges of the Southern Association of Colleges and Schools has accredited Norfolk State to award associate, baccalaureate, master and doctoral degrees. Currently, Norfolk State offers three doctorate and 15 master's degrees, including master's degree programs in electronic engineering, computer science, and criminal justice. The school also offers 36 undergraduate degrees, including the only undergraduate degree in optical engineering in Virginia.

=== Schools ===
Norfolk State's undergraduate and graduate programs are divided into eight schools/colleges.

- School of Business
- School of Education
  - By 2004, NSU had a fast-track program for special education licensing.
- College of Liberal Arts
- College of Engineering, Science & Technology
- School of Social Work
- School of Extended Learning
- Honors College
- Graduate School

== Campus ==
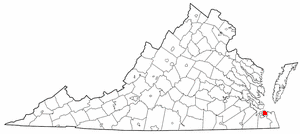

Located on the former site of the 50-acre (202,343 m^{2}) Memorial Park Golf Course, which the city of Norfolk sold to the school for one dollar, the campus now encompasses 134 acres (0.5 km^{2}) of land and 31 buildings.

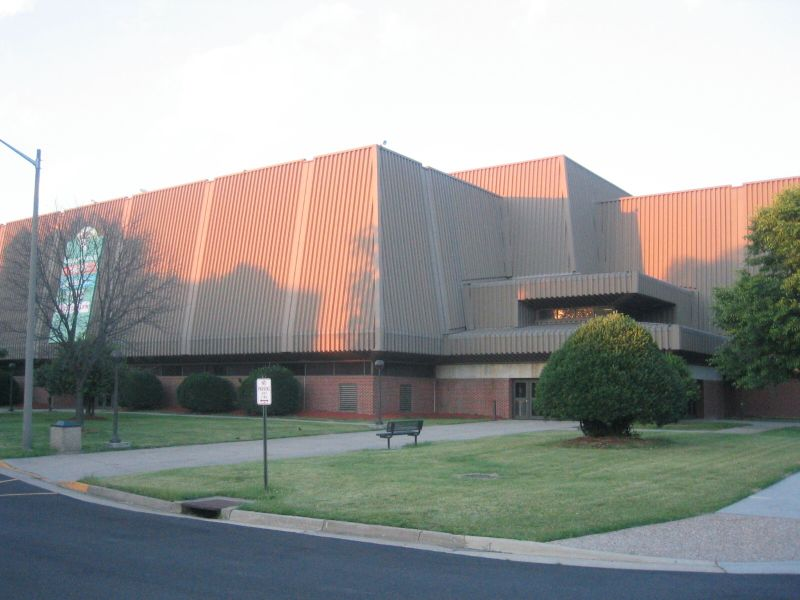
Joseph G. Echols Hall

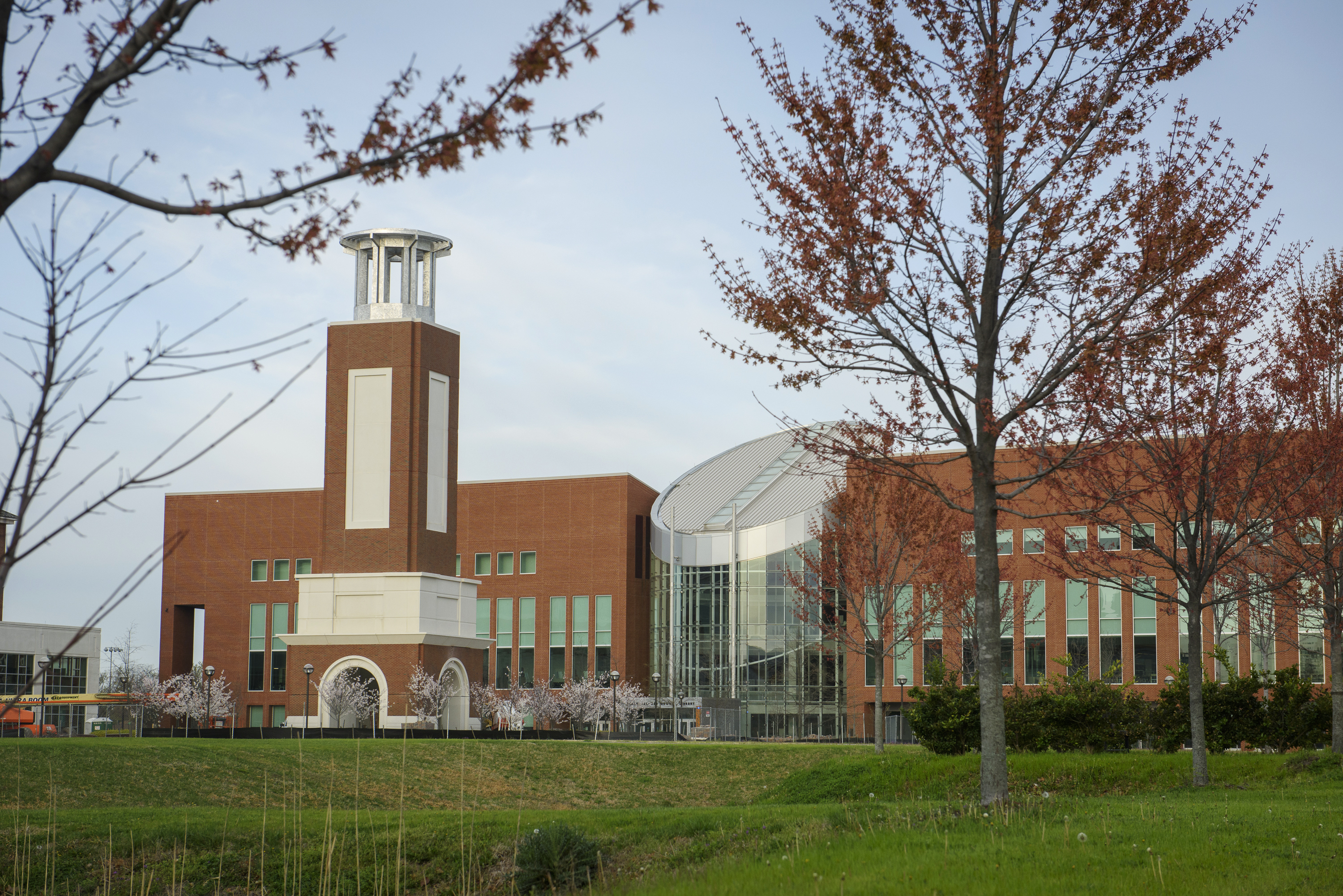
Lymnan Beecher Brooks Library

The Joseph G. Echols Memorial Hall is a large health, physical education, and ROTC complex with a seating capacity of 7,500. Other facilities include a 30,000-seat football stadium; a television studio and radio station, an African art museum, and a multi-purpose performing arts center. Research facilities include a life sciences building with a planetarium and a materials research wing with crystal growth, organic synthesis, laser spectroscopy, and magnetic resonance equipment.

In September 2009, the New Student Center facility opened. The three-story building, which includes a game room, a dining area, a new bookstore, a wellness center (work-out facility), student lounges, and administrative offices, marks the first of two major projects for NSU.

In January 2015, the construction of the New Nursing and General Classroom Building was completed, and in the fall 2017 NSU opened a new G.W.C. Brown Memorial Hall, a three-story, 154,000-square-foot academic building, which houses the School of Business, College of Liberal Arts, and Mass Communication and Math Department. The building also houses the box office, costume shop, scene shop, mainstage theater, studio theater, amphitheater, as well as drama faculty offices, classrooms, meeting rooms, study areas, and student lounges. Construction of a new four-story residential facility began in 2019. Once completed, the 193,424-square-foot residential facility will include a central two-story amenity space and 740 beds for first-year students.

Construction plans for a new science building and physical plant are underway. Other recent construction on the campus include the new police station (2007), the Marie V. McDemmond Center for Applied Research (2006), and the Spartan Suites Apartments (2001), and state-of-the-art library (2012).

== Student life ==
Undergraduate demographics as of fall 2023
Race and ethnicity	Total
Black	84%
Two or more races	6%
Hispanic	5%
International student	2%
White	2%
Unknown	1%
Economic diversity
Low-income (Note: The percentage of students who received an income-based federal Pell grant intended for low-income students.)	63%
Affluent (Note: The percentage of students who are a part of the American middle class at the bare minimum.)	37%

The university offers organized and informal co-curricular activities including 63 student organizations, leadership workshops, intramural activities, student publications and student internships.

=== Athletics ===
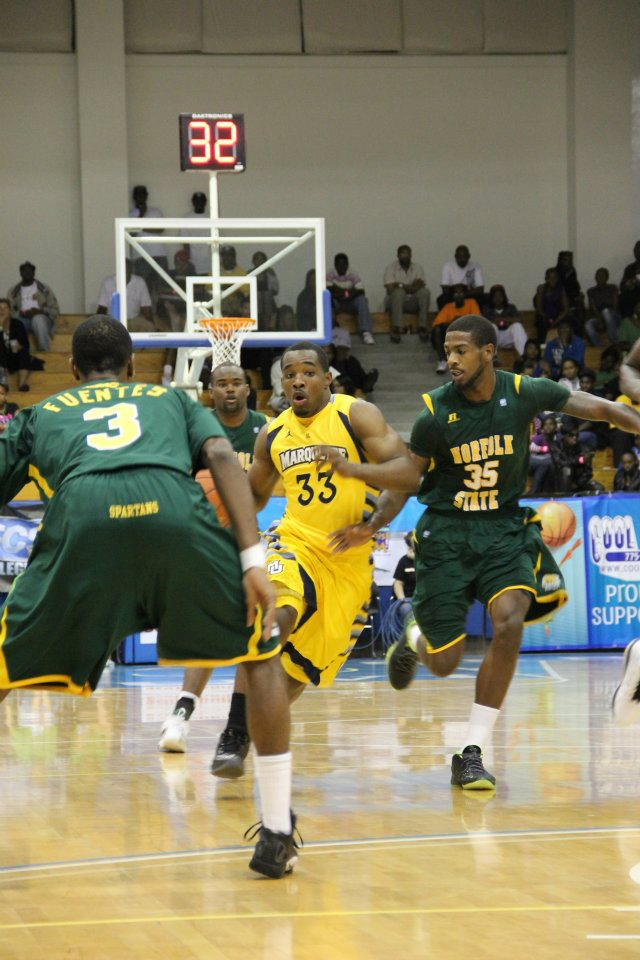
Norfolk State Spartans men's basketball players at the 2011 Paradise Jam Tournament

Norfolk State sports teams participate in NCAA Division I (Football Championship Subdivision for all sports including football) in the Mid-Eastern Athletic Conference (MEAC). Norfolk State was formerly a member of the Eastern Intercollegiate Conference (1953–1960) and the Central Intercollegiate Athletic Association (1962–1996).

The 2011–12 Norfolk State Spartans men's basketball team won the 2012 MEAC men's basketball tournament championship which gave them the conference's automatic bid in the 2012 NCAA Men's Division I Basketball Tournament, the school's first ever appearance in the tournament. The Spartans, a 15 seed, defeated the #2 seeded Missouri Tigers in the second round, 86–84. This victory was only the fifth time in NCAA Tournament history that a 15 seed defeated a 2 seed, with the last coming in 2001 by MEAC in-state rival Hampton.

=== Marching band ===
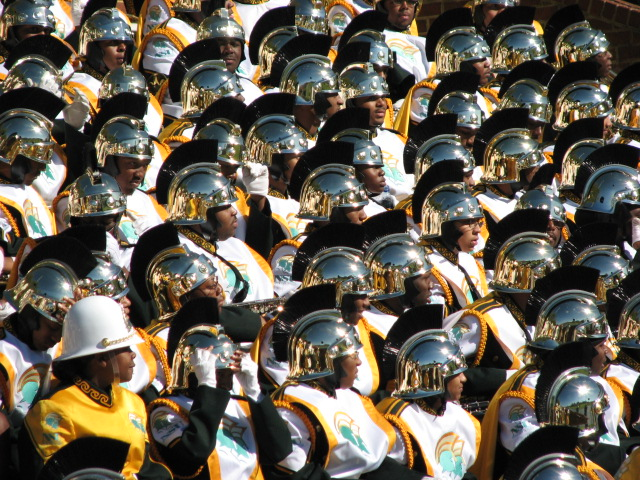
Spartan Legion Band in 2006

The Spartan "Legion" Marching Band was founded in 1974. There are 230 members. The band performs at campus events and during some Norfolk State football and basketball games. They were featured performers in the Honda Battle of the Bands in 2007 and 2008. In 2018 they were featured in the official music video for the song "Heavy Metal" by French house act Justice. The Spartan "Legion" performed at the 2023 Tournament of Roses Parade in Pasadena, California.

=== National fraternities and sororities ===
All nine of the National Pan-Hellenic Council organizations currently have chapters at Norfolk State University. Other academic, honor, band, religious, and service fraternities and sororities are present on campus as well.

=== Student media ===
==== Newspaper ====
The Spartan Echo is the official student-produced newspaper of Norfolk State University. The paper is available in print (available twice a month) and on the web (updated daily).

==== WNSB radio ====
Norfolk State operates WNSB (FM) radio, which broadcasts in stereo 24 hours a day from the campus and covers all of the Hampton Roads, Virginia, area, reaching the Eastern Shore of Virginia, northeast North Carolina and the Richmond, Virginia, suburbs. Established on February 22, 1980 and known as "Hot 91.1", WNSB's programming is also broadcast via the internet.

== Notable faculty and staff ==
This list of notable faculty and staff contains current and former faculty, staff and presidents of the Norfolk State University.

Name	Department	Notability	Reference
Na'im Akbar	Psychology	Clinical psychologist, prominent lecturer, and author on the psychology of Africans	
Belinda C. Anderson	History	11th president of Virginia Union University	
Anthony Evans	Athletic	Current interim head men's basketball coach at Norfolk State University and former head coach at Delhi Tech (Delhi, N.Y.) and Ulster County Community College (Kingston, N.Y.)	
Yacob Haile-Mariam	Business	Elected member of the Ethiopian parliament and a former senior prosecutor for the International Criminal Tribunal for Rwanda	
Adolphus Hailstork	Music	Former professor of music and composer-in-residence at Norfolk State	
Robert R. Jennings	Administration	Current president of Alabama Agricultural and Mechanical University	
Yvonne B. Miller	Professor emeritus	Democratic state senator who represented the 5th Senatorial District of the Commonwealth of Virginia	
Steve Riddick	Athletic	Olympic gold medal winner and former Norfolk State University coach	

== Notable alumni ==
This is a partial list of notable alumni which includes graduates, non-graduate former students, and current students of Norfolk State University or predecessors such as Norfolk State College.

Name	Class year	Notability	Reference(s)
Willard Bailey	1962	Former head football coach at Virginia Union University, Norfolk State University, and Saint Paul's College	
Gordon Banks		Guitarist, producer, writer and musical director	
Kris Bankston		Basketball player in the Israeli Basketball Premier League	
Al Beard		Former ABA player for the New Jersey Americans	
Ron Bolton	1972	Former NFL player for the New England Patriots and the Cleveland Browns	
Karen Briggs		Violinist	
Chris Brown		Bahamian track & field sprinter	
Don Carey	2009	NFL safety for the Browns, Jaguars, Lions	
Eric Crozier		Former MLB player for the Toronto Blue Jays	
Bob Dandridge	1969	Former NBA player for the Milwaukee Bucks and the Washington Bullets	
Denise Dowse	1984	Actress and director	
Julian Manly Earls	1964	Ninth director of the NASA Glenn Research Center	
Ray Epps	1977	Former NBA player for the Golden State Warriors	
Evelyn J. Fields	1971	Former director of the Office of the National Oceanic and Atmospheric Administration (NOAA) Corps Operations and the NOAA Commissioned Corps; first woman and first African-American to hold this position	
Future Man		Percussionist and member of the jazz quartet Béla Fleck and the Flecktones	
Willie Gillus		Former NFL player for the Green Bay Packers	
Elbert Guillory		Republican member of the Louisiana State Senate from Opelousas, Louisiana; elected as a Democrat in 2007 but switched parties in 2013	
Joshua Hall		State representative in Connecticut	
Algie Howell		Politician	
Jedidah Isler	2003	First African-American woman to receive a PhD in astrophysics from Yale University, in 2014	
Raymond Alvin Jackson	1970	United States District Court judge for the Eastern District of Virginia	
Ray Jarvis		Former NFL player for the Atlanta Falcons, Buffalo Bills, Detroit Lions, and the New England Patriots	
Leroy Jones		Former NFL player for the San Diego Chargers	
Pee Wee Kirkland		First-round NBA draft pick (1969, Chicago Bulls) and notable Rucker Park street basketball star; as a junior, he teamed with Bob Dandridge, and was named to the all-tournament team at the NCAA Mideast Regional in 1967	
Nathan McCall		Former reporter for the Virginian Pilot-Ledger Star, the Atlanta Journal-Constitution, and The Washington Post and the author of the best-selling book Makes Me Wanna Holler	
Yvonne B. Miller		Democratic state senator who represents the 5th Senatorial District of the Commonwealth of Virginia	
Alex Moore		American football player	
Kyle O'Quinn	2012	NBA player for the New York Knicks	
David Pope	1984	Former NBA player for the Utah Jazz, Kansas City Kings, and the Seattle SuperSonics	
Ken Reaves		Former NFL player for the Atlanta Falcons, New Orleans Saints, and the St. Louis Cardinals	
Tim Reid	1968	Comedian, actor, director	
Randall Robinson		Lawyer, author and activist, founder of TransAfrica	
James Edward Roe	1995	Former NFL player for the Baltimore Ravens and Arena Football League player for the San Jose SaberCats	
J.B. Smoove		Actor, writer, and stand-up comedian, best known for role as Leon on Curb Your Enthusiasm	
Pat Spearman		Politician, cleric, veteran	
Chandra Sturrup		Bahamian track sprinter; gold medal winner at the 2000 Olympics	
Shawn Z. Tarrant	1998	Member, Maryland House of Delegates	
Andrew Warren	1993	Former U.S. diplomat to Algeria	
Susan Wigenton	1984	Federal judge, United States District Court for the District of New Jersey	
D'Extra Wiley		Entertainment veteran, producer and former MCA Records R&B artist for the 90s New Jack group II D Extreme	

== See also ==
- Education in Norfolk, Virginia
- List of colleges and universities which have signed the Presidents Letter
- Sports in Norfolk, Virginia
