= Lake Forest Academy =

Preparatory school in Lake Forest, Illinois, US

Coordinates: 42°14′52″N 87°53′29″W

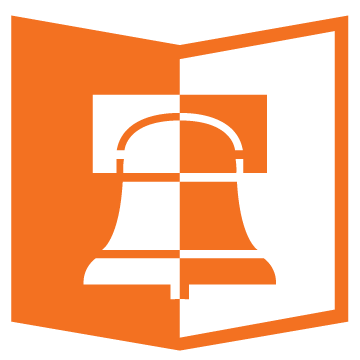

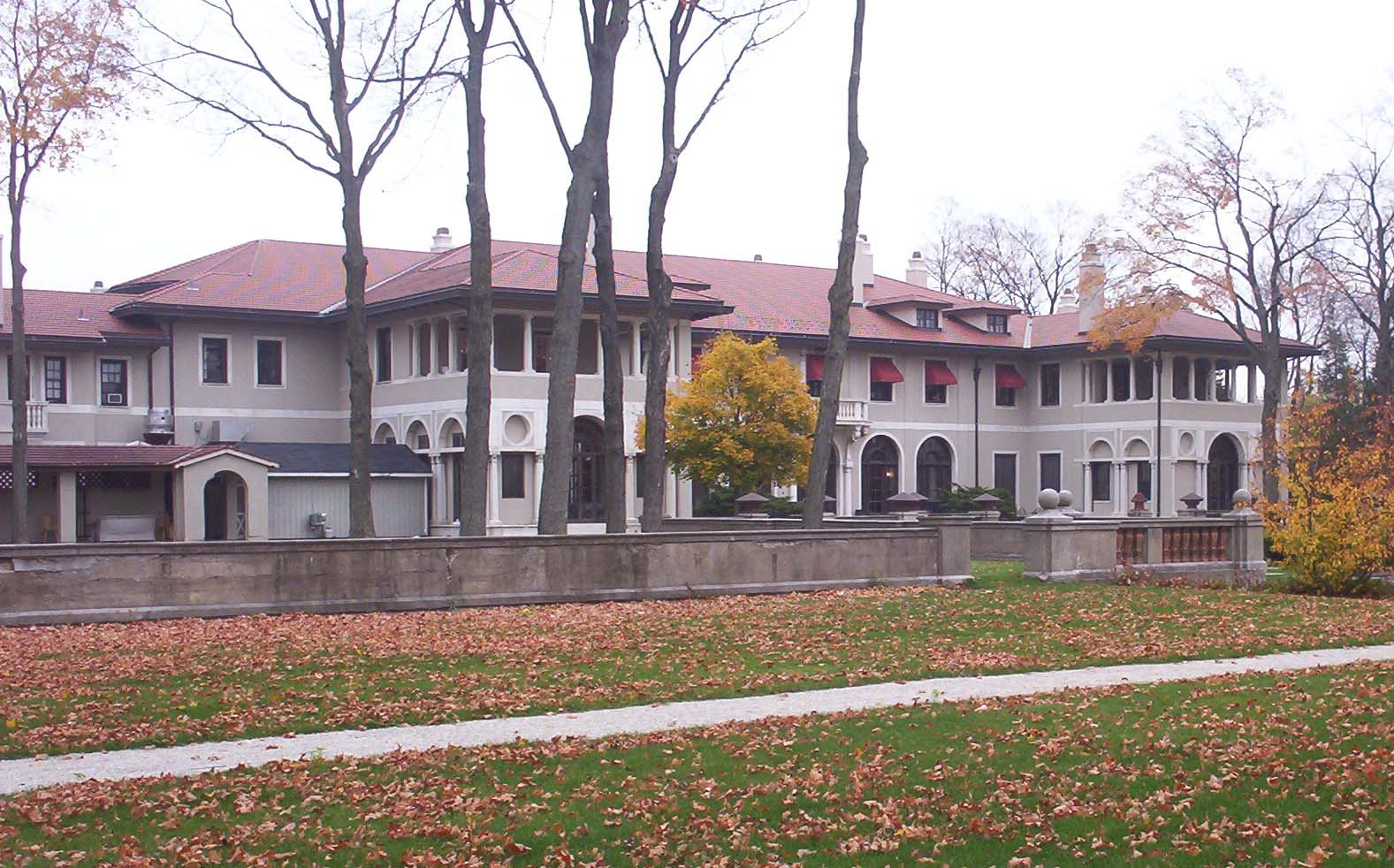
- Reid Hall, which houses the English department and administrative offices
- Lake Forest, Illinois; United States

Information
- Type: Independent, college-prep, day and boarding
- Motto: "Midwestern Heart. Global Mind"
- Established: 1857; 1974—Merged with Ferry Hall School
- Founder: Sylvester Lind
- CEEB code: 142525
- Head of School: Tom Johnson
- Faculty: 118
- Grades: 9–12
- Gender: Co-educational
- Enrollment: 435; 52% day, 48% boarding
- Average class size: 12 students
- Student to teacher ratio: 6:1
- Campus: Suburban, 150 acres (1 km^{2})
- Colors: Orange and black
- Athletics: 27 sports
- Mascot: Caxy/Frog
- Website: lfanet.org

Lake Forest Academy (also known as LFA) is a co-educational college preparatory school for boarding and day students in grades 9 through 12. The school is located on the North Shore in Lake Forest, Illinois, United States, about 30 miles north of Chicago.

== History ==
The academy (known as "LFA") was founded in 1857 as a key part of plans for Lake Forest more generally. In tune with the religious revivalism of the time period, the boys preparatory school was Presbyterian. LFA's first principal—Samuel F. Miller—had been one of the civil engineers who helped build the railway, as well as a founder of the Presbyterian Church in town.

Life for early students was rustic. An outdoor pump provided water for drinking and washing. In the years prior to the Civil War, the student body received military training from the eccentric Elmer Ellsworth. He would go on to acquire fame for being the first officer to be killed in the conflict.

The Young Ladies' Seminary at Ferry Hall, later simplified to Ferry Hall School, was founded in 1869, and was considered a sister school. Lake Forest College was a third component of the original founders' design and opened its doors later although it uses the academy's founding date as its own. It has no formal relationship with the original schools.

It was during the leadership of Principal George Cutting (1887–1890) that the colors of orange and black were selected, perhaps influenced by the fact that Cutting had attended Princeton.

In May 1946, fire destroyed the school's main building. Headmaster E. Francis Bowditch telegrammed students and faculty with the following message: "You, not the buildings, are LFA. Carry on." In 1948, Lake Forest Academy moved its campus to where it is currently located, the large former estate of Chicago meat baron J. Ogden Armour. Armour had been forced to sell by the Depression of 1921, and a group led by Samuel Insull acquired the property.

At the celebration of the school's centennial in 1957, head of school Harold H. Corbin Jr declared, "The City of Lake Forest, born in an educational dream, should never allow itself to forget that in one vital sense it is a manufacturing town--not merely residential--and its sole demonstrable product is education." The poet Robert Frost and Princeton president Harold Dodds also visited campus and gave speeches during the festivities. A headmaster's residence was built on campus and named for General Robert E. Wood, the business tycoon whose advocacy for America First before World War II turned into a penchant for Joseph McCarthy in the postwar period.

A merger of the boys' and girls' schools formed the coeducational Lake Forest Academy-Ferry Hall School in 1974. The school's name officially became Lake Forest Academy.

== School structure ==
As of the 2019–2020 school year, the school enrolled 435 students, with the students coming from 13 states and 35 countries. This school is among the most selective boarding schools in the United States. The current head of school is Tom Johnson. The school is accredited by the National Association of Independent Schools (NAIS), Independent Schools Association of the Central States (ISACS), and the Secondary School Admission Test Board (SSATB).

Lake Forest Academy is recognized college preparatory schools in the United States.

== Extracurricular activities ==
=== Athletics ===
The academy is a member of the Chicago Independent School League and competes against eight other independent schools in Chicago's suburbs in some sports.

The following sports are offered:

Fall:

- Cross-country running (Boys and girls)
- Field hockey (Girls)
- Golf (Boys)
- Ice hockey (Prep)
- Soccer (Boys)
- Swimming (Girls)
- Tennis (Girls)
- Volleyball (Girls)

Winter:

- Basketball (Boys and girls)
- Ice hockey (Boys, girls, and prep)
- Squash (Co-ed)
- Swimming (Boys)
- Chance (cheer/dance) (Co-ed)

Spring:

- Badminton (Girls)
- Baseball (Boys)
- Lacrosse (Boys and girls)
- Soccer (Girls)
- Softball
- Tennis (Boys)
- Track and field (Boys and girls)
- Volleyball (Boys)

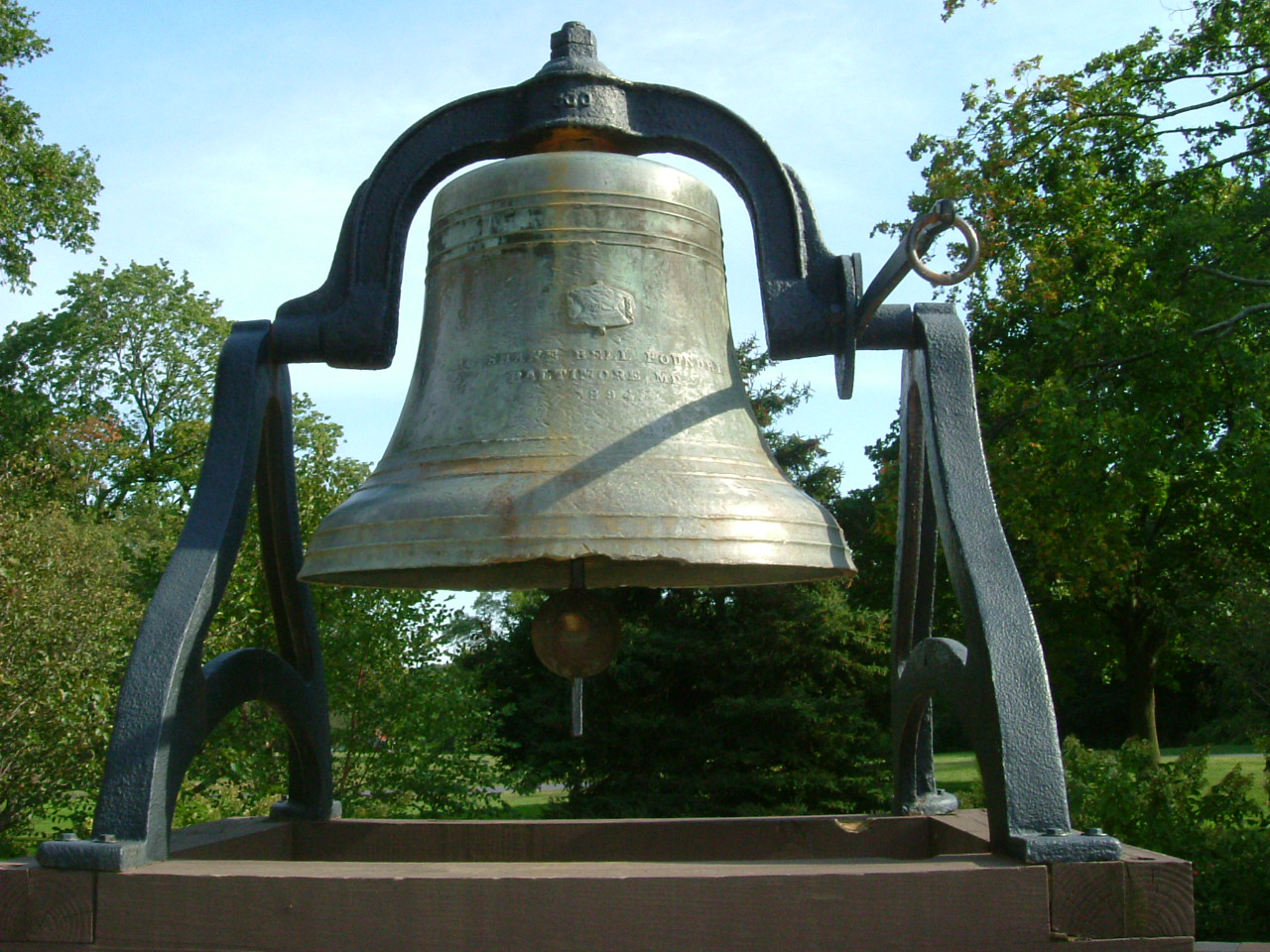
The Bowditch Bell, traditionally rung by sports teams after away victories

Lake Forest Academy is a full member of the Illinois High School Association, the body which governs most sports and competitive activities in Illinois.

=== Mascot ===

The LFA mascot is the "Caxy", a word that evolved on campus in the 1890s from "koax", the ancient Greek for the croaking sound ('ribbit') made by a frog. The school cheer dates back to at least 1896.

== Campus ==
Lake Forest Academy is situated on a wooded 150-acre (0.61 km^{2}) campus, which includes a small lake.

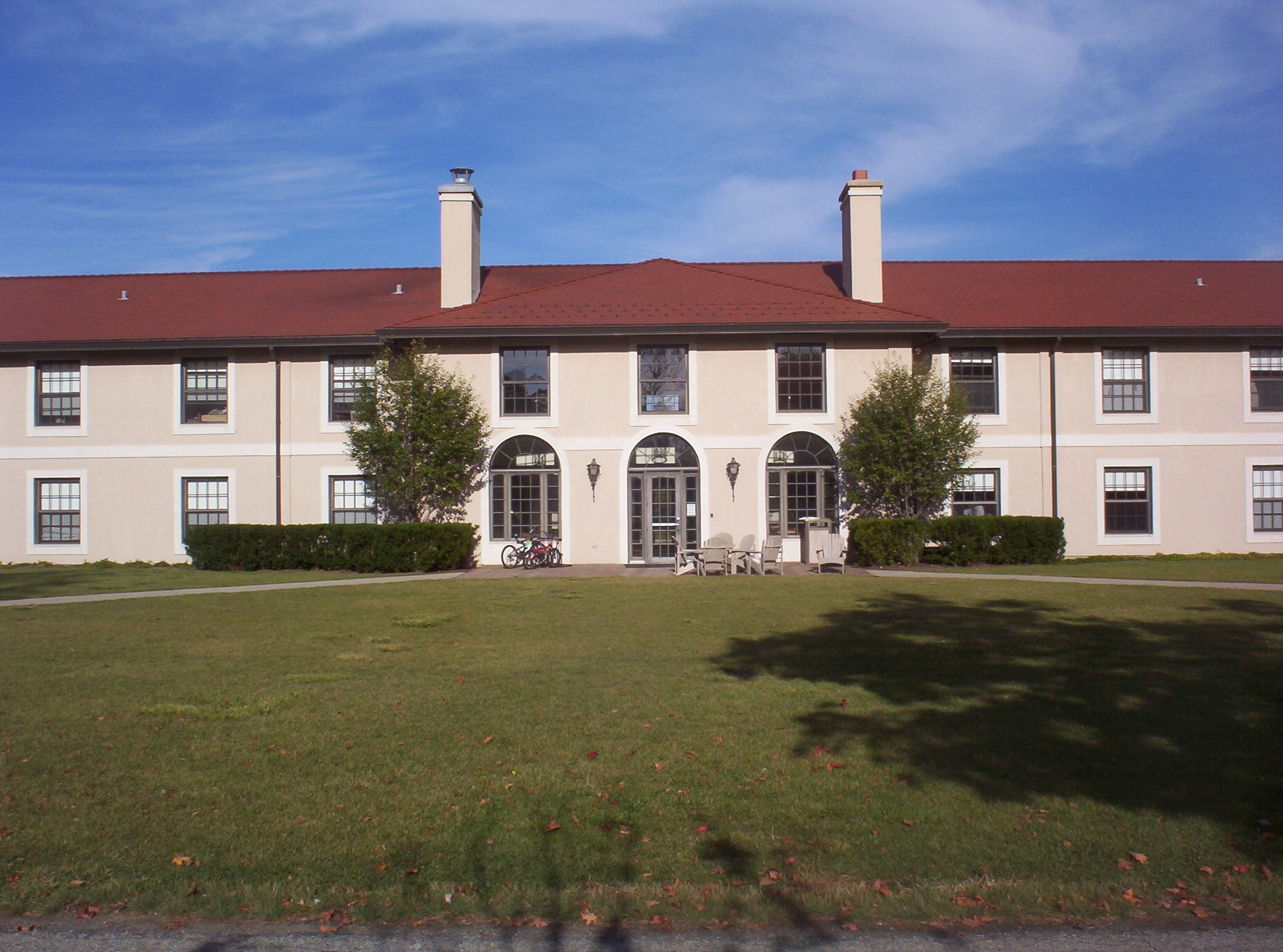
Atlass Hall

=== Dormitories ===
Lake Forest Academy houses its approximately 200 boarding students in five different campus dormitories. The dorms are single-sex.

==== Atlass Hall ====
Atlass is the newest boys' dormitory. Located in the center of campus, it is closest to the academic buildings and dining hall. In addition to generously sized rooms and new furniture, Atlass also sports a comfortable lounge area with a television, sofas, and pool table. Atlass is a two-story building that houses 70 boys and four faculty members in apartments on either north or south end of the dorm.

Atlass opened in January, 1999 following a grant from H. Leslie Atlass Jr., class of 1936, in honor of his father (class of 1912).

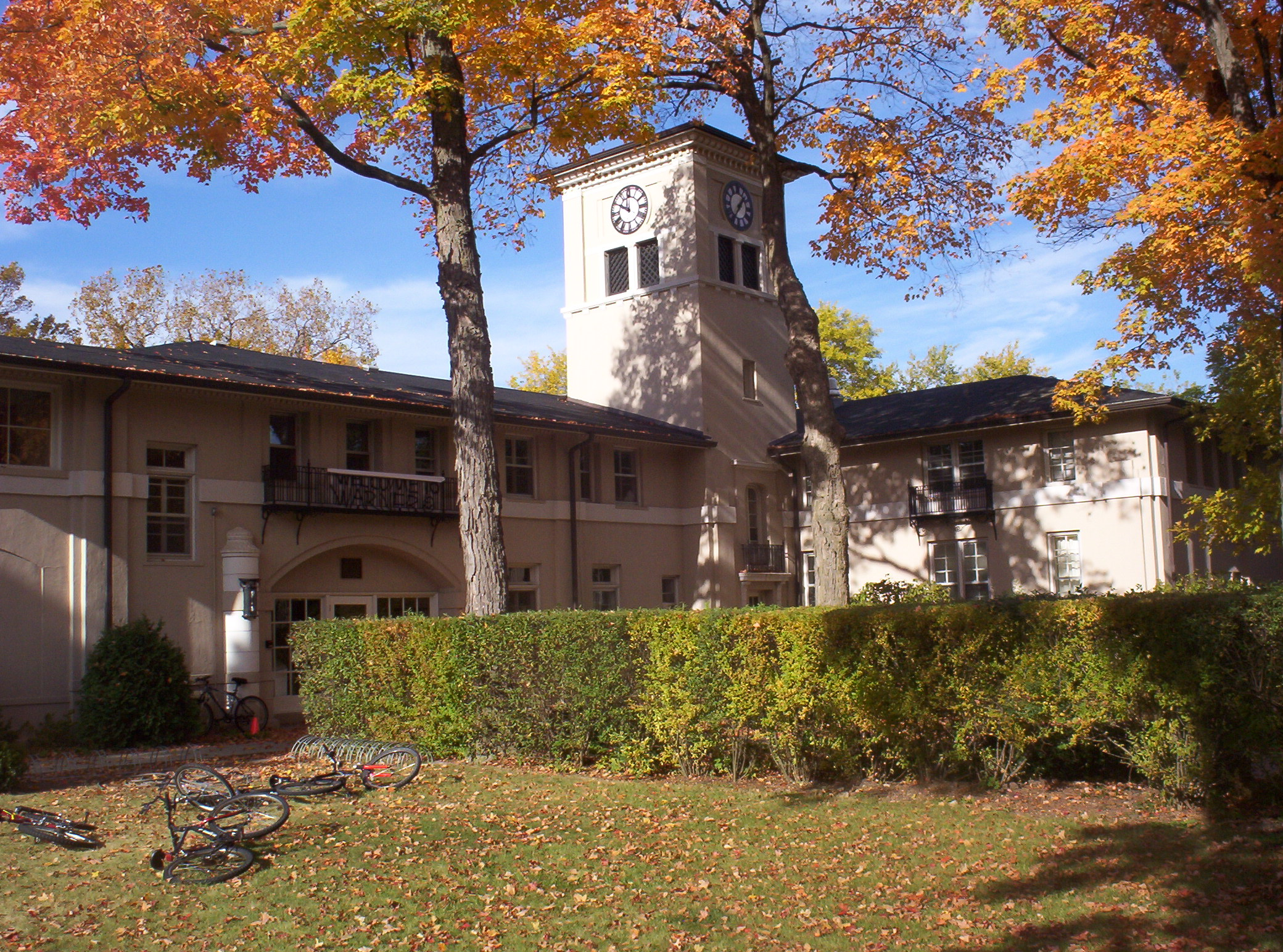
Warner House

==== Warner House ====
Warner House houses about 30 boys and five faculty members; four in the actual structure, and one family in the attached Remsen Cottage. Warner is acknowledged to be the oldest structure on the Lake Forest Academy campus, thought in campus lore to have been a horse stable in the years before the academy when J. Ogden Armour occupied the campus space. Upon the academy's relocation to its current physical plant in 1948, the Board of Trustees dedicated the building to Ezra J. Warner Jr., class of 1895. Warner is located near the former football field and with its relatively large number of faculty, has always been a dormitory that epitomizes the strong connection between students and faculty at LFA.

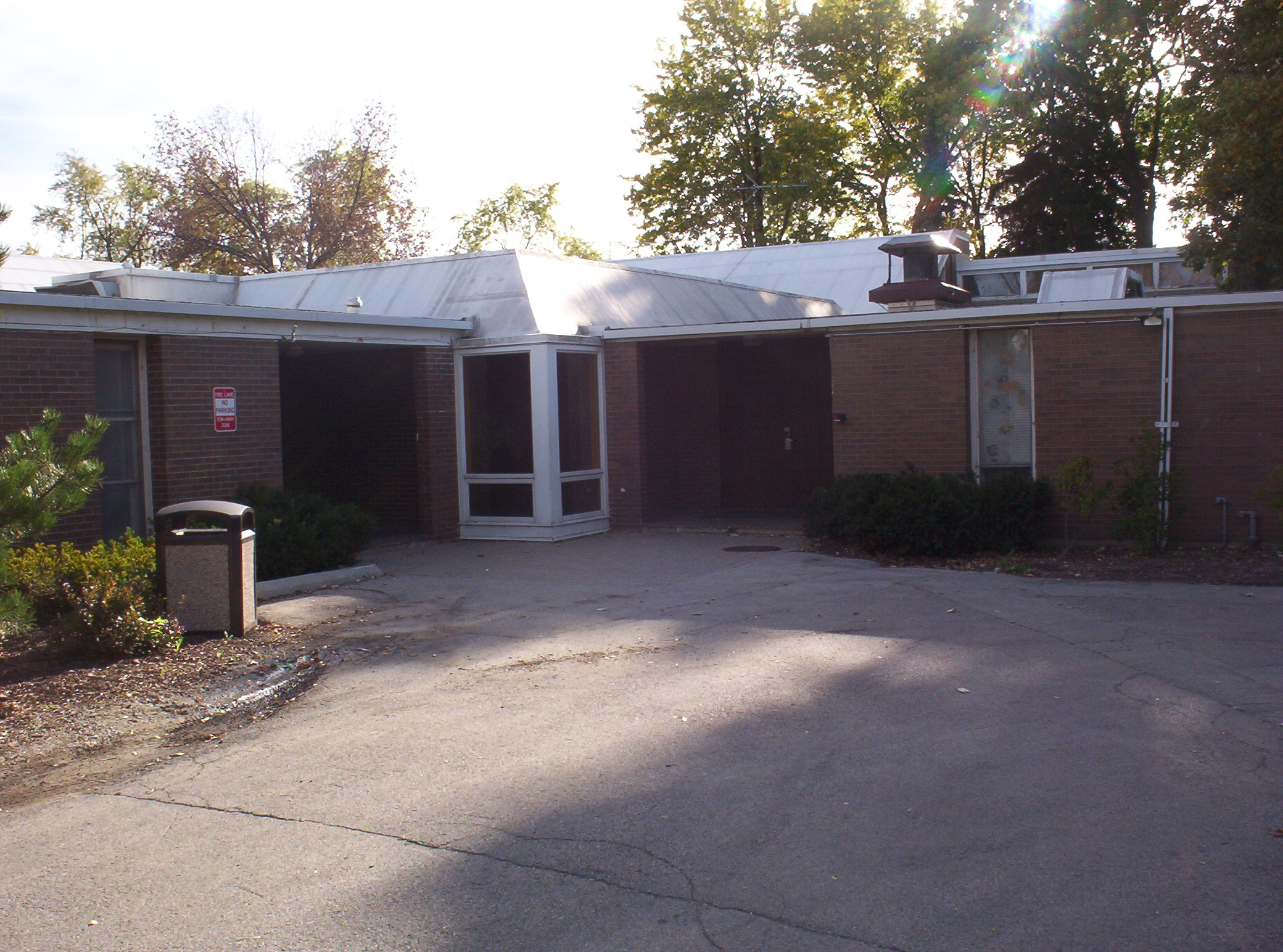
Marshall Field House

==== Marshall Field House ====
Marshall Field House was named after Marshall Field, the founder of Marshall Field and Company, the Chicago-based chain of department stores. A substantial donation was made by Field to the academy, and the Marshall Field House was dedicated to him on October 9, 1965.

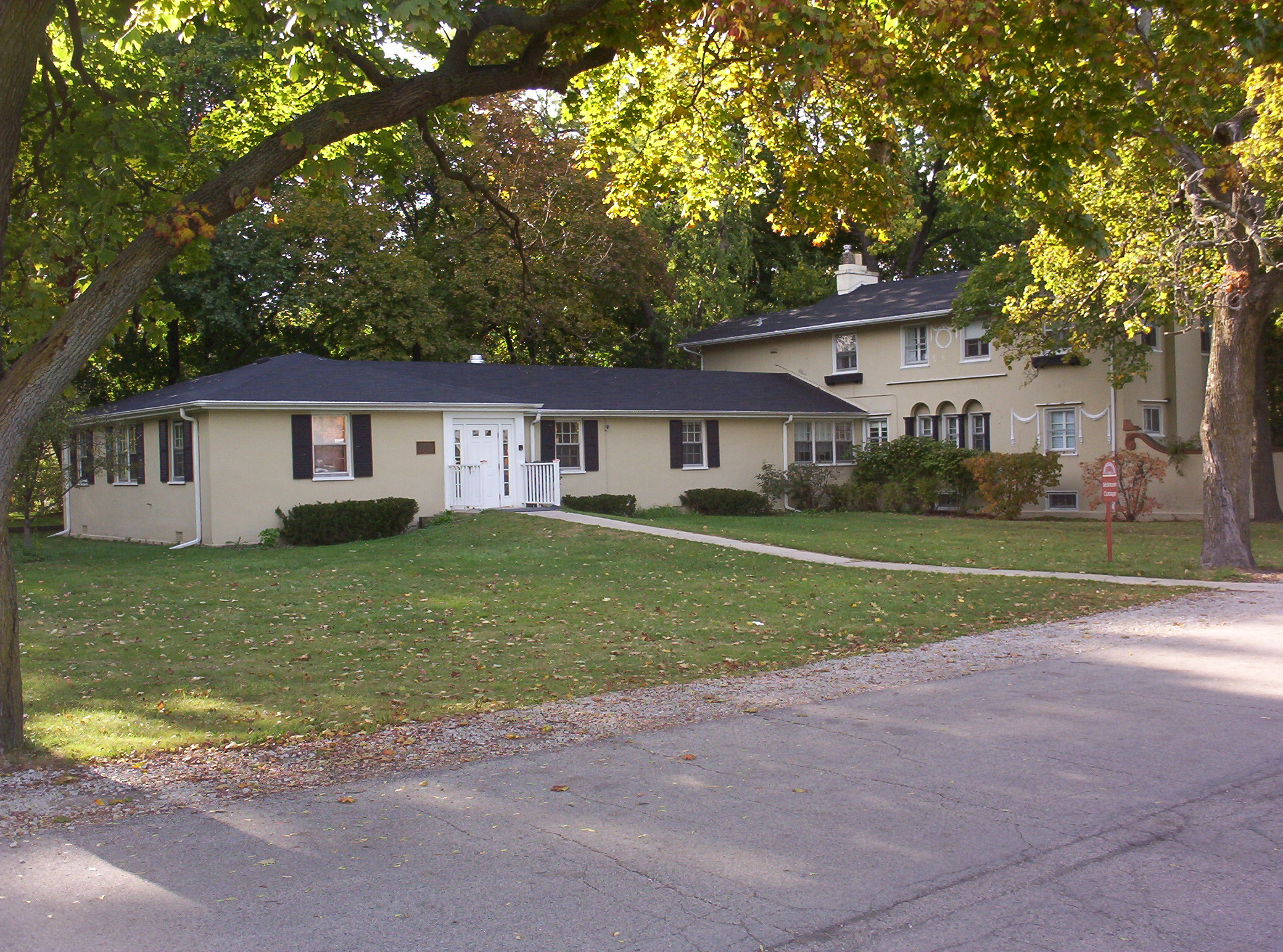
McIntosh Cottage

==== McIntosh Cottage ====
McIntosh Cottage (known simply as "Mac") is a unique dormitory, housing only nine girls in five rooms. In addition to the nine student residents, McIntosh houses two faculty members in apartments. McIntosh was named for Arthur T. McIntosh, class of 1896, by his son.

== Awards and recognition ==
=== On film ===
The campus has been used as a shooting location for several films, among them Damien: Omen II, Ordinary People, The Babe, and The Package.

== Notable alumni ==
See List of Lake Forest Academy alumni

== Former headteachers ==
Some headmasters went on to be leaders at universities: William Mather Lewis was in office from 1905 to 1913 and subsequently president of George Washington University, thereafter Lafayette College. E. Francis Bowditch was headmaster between 1941 and 1951 and later a dean at MIT. John Wayne Richards led the school from 1913 until 1941. His plan of a rotating class schedule received coverage in Time magazine in both 1930 and 1931. Harold Harlow Corbin Jr. served as head of the school from 1951 until 1969.
