= List of FIU Panthers men's basketball head coaches =

The following is a list of FIU Panthers men's basketball head coaches. There have been ten head coaches of the Panthers in their 45-season history.

FIU's current head coach is Joey Cantens. He was hired as the Panthers' head coach in March 2026, replacing Jeremy Ballard, who was fired after the 2025-26 season.

No.	Tenure	Coach	Years	Record	Pct.
1	1981–1990	Rich Walker	9	108–134	.446
2	1990–1995	Bob Weltlich	5	59–84	.413
3	1995–2000	Shakey Rodriguez	5	79–66	.545
4	2000–2004 (Note: FIU vacated 12 wins from the 2002–03 and 2003–04 seasons. Marsh's on-court record is 31–84 (.270).)	Donnie Marsh	4	19–84	.184
5	2004–2009 (Note: FIU vacated 20 wins from the 2004–05 and 2005–06 seasons. Rouco's on-court record is 55–94 (.369).)	Sergio Rouco	5	35–94	.271
6	2009–2012	Isiah Thomas	3	26–65	.286
7	2012–2013	Richard Pitino	1	18–14	.563
8	2013–2018	Anthony Evans	5	65–94	.409
9	2018–2026	Jeremy Ballard	8	113–141	.445
10	2026–present	Joey Cantens	1	0–0	–
Totals		10 coaches	45 seasons	554–776	.417
Records updated through end of 2025–26 season Source
