= Beach Institute =

Beach Institute may refer to:

- Beach High School, Savannah, Georgia (USA), formerly known as Beach Institute
- Beach Institute African-American Cultural Center
