= List of Norfolk State Spartans men's basketball head coaches =

The following is a list of Norfolk State Spartans men's basketball head coaches. There have been 12 head coaches of the Trojans in their 70-season history.

Norfolk State's current head coach is Robert Jones. He was hired as the Spartans' head coach in February 2014 after serving as interim head coach replacing Anthony Evans, who left to become head coach at FIU.

No.	Tenure	Coach	Years	Record	Pct.
1	1953–1962	John Turpin	9	138–81	.630
2	1962–1969	Ernie Fears	7	146–31	.825
3	1969–1973	Bob Smith	4	86–25	.775
4	1973–1978; 1981–1990	Charles Christian	14	318–95	.770
5	1978–1981	Lucias Mitchell	3	61–28	.685
6	1990–1991	Isaac Morehead	1	15–13	.536
7	1991–1998	Michael Bernard	7	141–67	.678
8	1998–1999	Mel Coleman	1	15–12	.556
9	1999–2002	Wil Jones	3	34–52	.395
10	2002–2007	Dwight Freeman	5	63–83	.432
11	2007–2013	Anthony Evans	6	99–94	.513
12	2013–present (Note: Jones served as interim head coach for the 2013–14 season after Anthony Evans' resignation, and was named permanent head coach in February 2014.)	Robert Jones	10	188–137	.578
Totals		12 coaches	70 seasons	1,304–718	.645
Records updated through end of 2022–23 season Source
