= Roger Moore (basketball) =

American basketball player

Personal information
- Listed height: 6 ft 7 in (2.01 m)

Career information
- High school: Beach (Savannah, Georgia)
- College: Georgia Southern (1967–1970); Columbus State (1970–1971)
- NBA draft: 1971: 12th round, 186th overall pick
- Drafted by: Atlanta Hawks
- Position: Center

Career history
- 1972–1974: Hamburg / Hazleton Bullets

Career highlights
- All-EBA Second Team (1974)
- Stats at Basketball Reference

Roger Moore is an American former professional basketball player. He became the first African-American to receive an athletic scholarship in Georgia when he was recruited by Georgia Southern College (now Georgia Southern University) in 1967. Moore played college basketball for the Georgia Southern Eagles and Columbus State Cougars before he was selected in the 1971 NBA draft by the Atlanta Hawks. He played professionally for the Hamburg / Hazleton Hawks of the Eastern Basketball Association (EBA) and in the Caribbean.

== High school career ==
Moore attended Beach High School in Savannah, Georgia, where he was a starter on the 1966–67 team that won the first integrated high school state basketball championship in Georgia. He was a teammate of Larry "Gator" Rivers.

== College career ==
The head coach of the Georgia Southern Eagles basketball team, Frank Radovich, wanted to integrate his team and was permitted by Georgia Southern president, Zach S. Henderson, on the condition that players were recruited within 50 miles of the campus in Statesboro. Moore was the first African-American player to receive an athletic scholarship in Georgia when he joined the team in 1967. As a 6 ft 7 in (2.01 m) center, he averaged 14.3 points and 16.5 rebounds during his freshman season. Moore averaged 16.3 points and 13.7 rebounds as a sophomore and 19.4 points and 13.4 rebounds as a junior. He scored a total of 1,200 points during his career with the Eagles and ranked tenth on the all-time scorer's list.

Moore was forced to transfer to Columbus College (now Columbus State University) for his senior year because of academic issues.

== Professional career ==
Moore was selected by the Atlanta Hawks in the 12th round of the 1971 NBA draft with the 186th overall pick.

Moore played for the Hamburg / Hazleton Bullets of the Eastern Basketball Association (EBA) from 1972 to 1974. He led the league in rebounding during the 1973–74 season with 447 total rebounds. Moore was selected to the All-EBA Second Team in 1974 when he averaged 19.1 points and 16.6 rebounds per game. He played for multiple seasons professionally in the Caribbean.
