= 2011–12 Norfolk State Spartans men's basketball team =

American college basketball season

2011–12 Norfolk State Spartans men's basketball
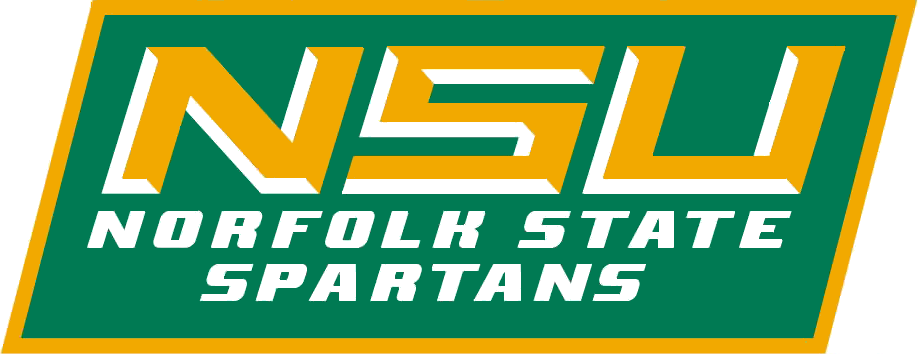

MEAC tournament champions

NCAA Tournament, Round of 32
- Conference: Mid-Eastern Athletic Conference
- Record: 26–10 (13–3 MEAC)
- Head coach: Anthony Evans (5th season)
- Assistant coaches: Robert Jones; Larry Vickers; Wilson Washington
- Home arena: Joseph G. Echols Memorial Hall

2011–12 MEAC men's basketball standings
	Conf.				Overall
Team	W		L	PCT	W		L	PCT
Savannah State	14	–	2	.875	21	–	12	.636
Norfolk State †	13	–	3	.813	26	–	10	.722
Delaware State	12	–	4	.750	15	–	14	.517
Bethune–Cookman	11	–	5	.688	18	–	17	.514
North Carolina Central	10	–	6	.625	17	–	15	.531
Coppin State	9	–	7	.563	14	–	16	.467
North Carolina A&T	7	–	9	.438	12	–	20	.375
Hampton	6	–	10	.375	12	–	21	.364
Morgan State	6	–	10	.375	9	–	20	.310
Howard	6	–	10	.375	10	–	21	.323
Florida A&M	6	–	10	.375	10	–	23	.303
Maryland Eastern Shore	4	–	12	.250	7	–	23	.233
South Carolina State	0	–	16	.000	5	–	26	.161
† 2012 MEAC tournament winner As of March 16, 2012; Rankings from AP Poll

The 2011–12 Norfolk State Spartans men's basketball team represented Norfolk State University during the 2011–12 NCAA Division I men's basketball season. The Spartans, led by fifth year head coach Anthony Evans, played their home games at Joseph G. Echols Memorial Hall and are members of the Mid-Eastern Athletic Conference. They finished the season 26–10, 13–3 in MEAC play to finish in second place. They were the champions of the MEAC Basketball tournament to earn the conference's automatic bid in the 2012 NCAA tournament, the school's first ever appearance in the tournament. As a 15 seed, the Spartans shocked the 2 seed Missouri in the second round, 86–84. This was only the fifth time in NCAA Tournament history that a 15 seed defeated a 2 seed, with the last coming in 2001 (later that same day, 15 seed Lehigh defeated 2 seed Duke). Norfolk State would fall to Florida in the second round.

== Roster ==
Number	Name	Position	Height	Weight	Year	Hometown
1	Rob Johnson	Forward	6–7	220	Junior	Roswell, Georgia
2	Kievyn Lila-St. Rose	Guard/Forward	6–6	180	Sophomore	Corona, New York
3	Jamel Fuentes	Guard	6–3	175	Sophomore	Brooklyn, New York
5	Winston Graham	Guard	6–2	180	Sophomore	Bronx, New York
10	Kyle O'Quinn	Center	6–10	240	Senior	Jamaica, New York
11	Pendarvis Williams	Guard	6–6	195	Sophomore	Philadelphia, Pennsylvania
13	Quasim Pugh	Guard	6–0	175	Junior	Brooklyn, New York
15	Rodney McCauley	Guard/Forward	6–5	205	Senior	Dallas, Texas
20	Reggie Revels	Guard/Forward	6–4	205	Junior	Cincinnati, Ohio
21	Jordan Weathers	Guard	6–5	200	Sophomore	Los Angeles, California
22	Kris Brown	Guard	6–3	180	Junior	Suffolk, Virginia
23	Brandon Goode	Forward/Center	6–11	215	Sophomore	Bronx, New York
24	Brandon Wheeless	Guard/Forward	6–4	205	Senior	Stone Mountain, Georgia
31	Riley Maye	Forward	6–8	215	Sophomore	East Stroudsburg, Pennsylvania
32	Marcos Tamares	Forward	6–7	210	Senior	Queens, New York
35	Chris McEachin	Guard/Forward	6–6	195	Senior	Norfolk, Virginia
45	A.J. Rogers	Forward	6–7	220	Junior	Rosedale, New York

== Schedule ==
Date time, TV	Rank^{#}	Opponent^{#}	Result	Record	Site (attendance) city, state
Regular season
11/14/2011*; 7:00 pm		at No. 21 Marquette	L 68–99	0–1	Bradley Center (12,765); Milwaukee, WI
11/16/2011*; 8:00 pm		Randolph College	W 63–43	1–1	Joseph G. Echols Memorial Hall (2,009); Norfolk, VA
11/18/2011*; 1:00 pm		vs. Drexel; Paradise Jam First Round	W 61–56	2–1	Sports and Fitness Center (NA); Saint Thomas, USVI
11/20/2011*; 6:00 pm, FSN		vs. TCU; Paradise Jam Semifinals	W 66–53	3–1	Sports and Fitness Center (NA); Saint Thomas, USVI
11/21/2011*; 8:30 pm		vs. No. 16 Marquette; Paradise Jam Finals	L 57–59	3–2	Sports and Fitness Center (3,109); Saint Thomas, USVI
11/27/2011*; 4:00 pm		Eastern Kentucky	W 70–63	4–2	Joseph G. Echols Memorial Hall (375); Norfolk, VA
11/30/2011*; 7:00 pm		Elizabeth City State	L 57–69	4–3	Joseph G. Echols Memorial Hall (1,182); Norfolk, VA
12/03/2011; 6:00 pm		Savannah State	W 60–58	5–3 (1–0)	Joseph G. Echols Memorial Hall (766); Norfolk, VA
12/05/2011; 6:00 pm		South Carolina State	W 82–67	6–3 (2–0)	Joseph G. Echols Memorial Hall (1,013); Norfolk, VA
12/11/2011*; 4:00 pm, ESPN3		at Virginia Tech	L 60–73	6–4	Cassell Coliseum (8,869); Blacksburg, VA
12/14/2011*; 7:00 pm		Long Island	W 73–62	7–4	Joseph G. Echols Memorial Hall (504); Norfolk, VA
12/18/2011*; 5:00 pm		at Illinois State	L 36–68	7–5	Redbird Arena (3,320); Normal, IL
12/20/2011*; 7:00 pm		at Toledo	W 72–70	8–5	Savage Arena (3,781); Toledo, OH
12/23/2011*; 2:00 pm		at St. Francis (NY)	W 84–74	9–5	Generoso Pope Athletic Complex (763); Brooklyn, NY
01/01/2012*; 4:00 pm		at Navy	W 71–65	10–5	Alumni Hall (1,312); Annapolis, MD
01/07/2012; 6:00 pm		Maryland Eastern Shore	W 78–72	11–5 (3–0)	Joseph G. Echols Memorial Hall (1,506); Norfolk, VA
01/09/2012; 8:30 pm		Howard	W 68–48	12–5 (4–0)	Joseph G. Echols Memorial Hall (1,784); Norfolk, VA
01/14/2012; 4:30 pm		at Morgan State	W 90–89 ^{2OT}	13–5 (5–0)	Talmadge L. Hill Field House (2,531); Baltimore, MD
01/16/2012; 8:00 pm		at Coppin State	W 74–66	14–5 (6–0)	Physical Education Complex (2,531); Baltimore, MD
01/21/2012; 6:30 pm		at Hampton	W 80–75	15–5 (7–0)	Hampton Convocation Center (6,932); Hampton, VA
01/24/2012*; 7:00 pm		Morehead State	L 69–75	15–6	Joseph G. Echols Memorial Hall (1,561); Norfolk, VA
01/28/2012; 6:00 pm		Morgan State	W 76–59	16–6 (8–0)	Joseph G. Echols Memorial Hall (4,074); Norfolk, VA
01/30/2012; 8:00 pm		Coppin State	L 82–87	16–7 (8–1)	Joseph G. Echols Memorial Hall (1,714); Norfolk, VA
02/04/2012; 7:00 pm		at Delaware State	L 50–67	16–8 (8–2)	Memorial Hall (1,611); Dover, DE
02/06/2012; 7:30 pm		at Maryland Eastern Shore	W 72–60	17–8 (9–2)	Hytche Athletic Center (2,894); Princess Anne, MD
02/11/2012; 6:00 pm		Hampton	W 70–62	18–8 (10–2)	Joseph G. Echols Memorial Hall (6,191); Norfolk, VA
02/15/2012; 7:00 pm		Delaware State	L 63–73 ^{OT}	18–9 (10–3)	Joseph G. Echols Memorial Hall (1,661); Norfolk, VA
02/20/2012*; 7:00 pm		Longwood	W 66–52	19–9	Joseph G. Echols Memorial Hall (1,725); Norfolk, VA
02/25/2012; 4:00 pm		at Bethune-Cookman	W 75–72	20–9 (11–3)	Moore Gymnasium (NA); Daytona Beach, FL
02/27/2012; 7:30 pm		at Florida A&M	W 79–70	21–9 (12–3)	Moore Gymnasium (707); Daytona Beach, FL
03/01/2012; 8:00 pm		at North Carolina A&T	W 72–65	22–9 (13–3)	Corbett Sports Center (1,827); Greensboro, NC
2012 MEAC men's basketball tournament
03/07/2012; 8:00 pm	(2)	vs. (10) Howard; Quarterfinals	W 71–61	23–9	LJVM Coliseum (NA); Winston-Salem, NC
03/09/2012; 8:00 pm	(2)	vs. (11) Florida A&M; Semifinals	W 58–46	24–9	LJVM Coliseum (NA); Winston-Salem, NC
03/10/2012; 1:00 pm, ESPN2	(2)	vs. (4) Bethune-Cookman; Championship Game	W 73–70	25–9	LJVM Coliseum (NA); Winston-Salem, NC
2012 NCAA tournament
03/16/2012*; 4:40 pm, TNT	(15 W)	vs. (2 W) No. 3 Missouri; Second Round	W 86–84	26–9	CenturyLink Center Omaha (16,494); Omaha, NE
03/18/2012*; 6:10 p.m., TNT	(15 W)	vs. (7 W) No. 25 Florida; Third Round	L 50–84	26–10	CenturyLink Center Omaha (16,998); Omaha, NE
*Non-conference game. ^{#}Rankings from AP Poll. (#) Tournament seedings in parentheses. All times are in Eastern Time (#) during NCAA Tournament is seed with Region.
