= 2011–12 Savannah State Tigers basketball team =

American college basketball season

2011–12 Savannah State Tigers men's basketball
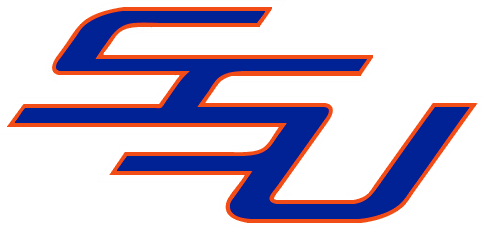

MEAC Regular Season Champions

NIT, 1st Round
- Conference: Mid-Eastern Athletic Conference
- Record: 21–12 (14–2 MEAC)
- Head coach: Horace Broadnax (7th season)
- Assistant coaches: Jay Gibbons (6th season); Clyde Wormley (4th season)
- Home arena: Tiger Arena

2011–12 MEAC men's basketball standings
	Conf.				Overall
Team	W		L	PCT	W		L	PCT
Savannah State	14	–	2	.875	21	–	12	.636
Norfolk State †	13	–	3	.813	26	–	10	.722
Delaware State	12	–	4	.750	15	–	14	.517
Bethune–Cookman	11	–	5	.688	18	–	17	.514
North Carolina Central	10	–	6	.625	17	–	15	.531
Coppin State	9	–	7	.563	14	–	16	.467
North Carolina A&T	7	–	9	.438	12	–	20	.375
Hampton	6	–	10	.375	12	–	21	.364
Morgan State	6	–	10	.375	9	–	20	.310
Howard	6	–	10	.375	10	–	21	.323
Florida A&M	6	–	10	.375	10	–	23	.303
Maryland Eastern Shore	4	–	12	.250	7	–	23	.233
South Carolina State	0	–	16	.000	5	–	26	.161
† 2012 MEAC tournament winner As of March 16, 2012; Rankings from AP Poll

The 2011–12 Savannah State Tigers basketball team represented Savannah State University in the 2011–12 NCAA Division I men's basketball season. Their head coach was Horace Broadnax in his seventh year. The Tigers played their home games at the Tiger Arena. After previously playing as a Division I Independent, the Tigers were new members of the Mid-Eastern Athletic Conference. The Tigers were the 2011–12 MEAC regular season champions and received an automatic bid into the 2012 NIT, their first ever appearance in any Division I tournament as a Division I member. The team posted a 21–10 overall mark and lead the MEAC in scoring defense, only allowing 58.9 points per game and were second in the conference in scoring margin (+5.4). In his sixth year as the head coach of the Tigers, Horace Broadnax was named the MEAC Coach of the Year as he guided the team to a 14–2 conference record and the school's first MEAC regular season title.

== Roster ==
2011–12 Savannah State Tigers men's basketball team
Players
Coaches

Pos.	#	Name	Height	Weight	Year	Hometown
F	00	Keith Edwards	6 ft 5 in (1.96 m)	—	So	Chicago, IL
G	1	Preston Blackmon	6 ft 0 in (1.83 m)	—	Jr	Hopkins, SC
G	2	Darnel Jones	6 ft 1 in (1.85 m)	—	Jr	Atlanta, GA
G	3	Deric Rudolph	5 ft 11 in (1.8 m)	—	Jr	Gadsen, AL
F	5	Christopher Spears	6 ft 7 in (2.01 m)	—	So	Ashburn, GA
G	10	Patrick Hendley	6 ft 4 in (1.93 m)	—	So	Orange Park, FL
G	11	Stephen Wilson	6 ft 1 in (1.85 m)	—	So	Jonesboro, GA
F	12	Joshua Montgomery	6 ft 4 in (1.93 m)	—	Jr	Smyrna, GA
G	13	Angelo Davis	6 ft 1 in (1.85 m)	—	So	Savannah, GA
G	15	Keierre Richards	6 ft 1 in (1.85 m)	—	So	Atlanta, GA
F	22	Rashad Hassan	6 ft 7 in (2.01 m)	—	Jr	Riverdale, GA
G	23	Cedric Smith	6 ft 3 in (1.91 m)	—	Jr	Bronx, NY
G	24	Richard Conner	6 ft 4 in (1.93 m)	—	Jr	Austell, GA
F	34	Arnold Lewis	6 ft 7 in (2.01 m)	—	Jr	Wauchula, FL
F	44	Jyles Smith	6 ft 8 in (2.03 m)	—	So	Fairburn, GA

Head coach

- Horace Broadnax (Georgetown)

Assistant coach(es)

- Jay Gibbons (Clayton State)
- Clyde Wormley (The Citadel)

Legend

- (C) Team captain
- (S) Suspended
- (I) Ineligible
- (W) Walk-on
- Injured
- Current redshirt

Roster
Last update: 1 November 2011

Source: Savannah State Men's Basketball Roster

== Schedule ==
Date time, TV	Opponent	Result	Record	Site city, state
Exhibition
Nov. 3*; 7:00 pm	Armstrong Atlantic State	W 70–64	–	Tiger Arena; Savannah, GA
Nov. 7*; 7:00 pm	Benedict	L 73–80	–	Tiger Arena; Savannah, GA
Regular Season
Nov. 12*; 12:00 pm	at Georgetown	L 54–83	0–1	Verizon Center; Washington, DC
Nov. 14*; 7:00 pm	at North Florida	L 57–62	0–2	UNF Arena; Jacksonville, FL
Nov. 16*; 7:00 pm	at Jacksonville	W 73–70 ^{OT}	1–2	Tiger Arena; Savannah, GA
Nov. 19*; 8:00 pm	at Indiana; Hoosier Invitational	L 65–94	3–1	Assembly Hall; Bloomington, IN
Nov. 21*; 7:00 pm	at Butler; Hoosier Invitational	L 42–57	1–4	Hinkle Fieldhouse; Indianapolis, IN
Nov. 25*; 7:00 pm	at Chattanooga; Hoosier Invitational	L 63–65	1–5	McKenzie Arena; Chattanooga, TN
Nov. 26*; 7:00 pm	vs. Gardner-Webb; Hoosier Invitational	W 72–66	2–5	McKenzie Arena; Chattanooga, TN
Dec. 1; 7:00 pm	at Hampton	W 65–49	3–5 (1–0)	Hampton Convocation Center; Hampton, VA
Dec. 3; 6:00 pm	at Norfolk State	L 58–60	3–6 (1–1)	Echols Hall; Norfolk, VA
Dec. 10*; 6:00 pm	Georgia Tech	L 45–65	3–7	Tiger Arena; Savannah, GA
Dec. 12*; 7:00 pm	Coastal Georgia	W 80–42	4–7	Tiger Arena; Savannah, GA
Dec. 15*; 7:00 pm, BTN	at No. 14 Wisconsin	L 33–66	4–8	Kohl Center; Madison, WI
Dec. 22*; 6:00 pm	Mount St. Mary's	W 45–41	5–8	Tiger Arena; Savannah, GA
Jan. 3*; 8:00 pm	at Arkansas	W 83–66	5–9	Bud Walton Arena; Fayetteville, AR
Jan. 7; 4:00 pm	Coppin State	W 72–60	6–9 (2–1)	Tiger Arena; Savannah, GA
Jan. 9; 8:00 pm	Morgan State	W 57–55	7–9 (3–1)	Tiger Arena; Savannah, GA
Jan. 14; 7:00 pm	at Florida A&M	W 69–58	8–9 (4–1)	Teaching Gym; Tallahassee, FL
Jan. 16; 7:30 pm	at Bethune-Cookman	L 62–68	8–10 (4–2)	Moore Gymnasium; Daytona Beach, FL
Jan. 21; 4:00 pm	South Carolina State	W 83–53	9–10 (5–2)	Tiger Arena; Savannah, GA
Jan. 23*; 7:00 pm	Stetson	W 75–45	10–10	Tiger Arena; Savannah, GA
Jan. 28; 4:00 pm	Howard	W 71–50	11–10 (6–2)	Tiger Arena; Savannah, GA
Jan. 31*; 7:00 pm	Trinity Baptist	W 86–56	12–10	Tiger Arena; Savannah, GA
Feb. 4; 4:00 pm	at South Carolina State	W 73–60	13–10 (7–2)	SHM Memorial Center; Orangeburg, SC
Feb. 6*; 8:00 pm	Texas A&M–Corpus Christi	W 55–49	14–10	Tiger Arena; Savannah, GA
Feb. 11; 4:00 pm	at North Carolina Central	W 67–57	15–10 (8–2)	McLendon–McDougald Gymnasium; Durham, NC
Feb. 13; 8:00 pm	at North Carolina A&T	W 66–59	16–10 (9–2)	Corbett Sports Center; Greensboro, NC
Feb. 18; 4:00 pm	Florida A&M	W 76–57	17–10 (10–2)	Tiger Arena; Savannah, GA
Feb. 20; 8:00 pm	Bethune-Cookman	W 67–44	18–10 (11–2)	Tiger Arena; Savannah, GA
Feb. 25; 4:00 pm	North Carolina Central	W 60–47	19–10 (12–2)	Tiger Arena; Savannah, GA
Feb. 27; 8:00 pm	North Carolina A&T	W 62–50	20–10 (13–2)	Tiger Arena; Savannah, GA
Mar. 1; 7:30 pm	at Maryland Eastern Shore	W 72–54	21–10 (14–2)	Hytche Athletic Center; Princess Anne, MD
MEAC Tournament
Mar. 7; 6:00 pm	vs. Hampton; Quarterfinals	L 46–59	21–11	LJVM Coliseum; Winston-Salem, NC
2012 NIT
Mar. 13 or Mar. 14*; 8:00 pm	at Tennessee; First Round	L 51–65	21–12	Thompson-Boling Arena; Knoxville, TN
*Non-conference game. ^{#}Rankings from Coaches' Poll. (#) Tournament seedings in parentheses. All times are in Eastern Time..

Source: 2011–12 Savannah State Men's Basketball Schedule
