= 2012 MEAC men's basketball tournament =

- Classification: Division I
- Season: 2011–12
- Teams: 13
- Site: Lawrence Joel Veterans Memorial Coliseum; Winston-Salem, North Carolina
- Champions: Norfolk State (1st title)
- Winning coach: Anthony Evans (1st title)
- Television: ESPN2

The 2012 Mid-Eastern Athletic Conference men's basketball tournament took place March 5–10, 2012 at the Lawrence Joel Veterans Memorial Coliseum in Winston-Salem, North Carolina. Norfolk State won the tournament and received an automatic bid into the 2012 NCAA tournament. The 2012 championship game was televised on ESPN2 on March 10. This was the final year in Winston-Salem, as the tournament moved to Norfolk, VA beginning in 2013.

== Format ==
With Savannah State and North Carolina Central in the MEAC as full Division I members, the MEAC had a new format for the 2012 tournament. The top three seeds received a first round bye.

2011–12 MEAC men's basketball standings
	Conf.				Overall
Team	W		L	PCT	W		L	PCT
Savannah State	14	–	2	.875	21	–	12	.636
Norfolk State †	13	–	3	.813	26	–	10	.722
Delaware State	12	–	4	.750	15	–	14	.517
Bethune–Cookman	11	–	5	.688	18	–	17	.514
North Carolina Central	10	–	6	.625	17	–	15	.531
Coppin State	9	–	7	.563	14	–	16	.467
North Carolina A&T	7	–	9	.438	12	–	20	.375
Hampton	6	–	10	.375	12	–	21	.364
Morgan State	6	–	10	.375	9	–	20	.310
Howard	6	–	10	.375	10	–	21	.323
Florida A&M	6	–	10	.375	10	–	23	.303
Maryland Eastern Shore	4	–	12	.250	7	–	23	.233
South Carolina State	0	–	16	.000	5	–	26	.161
† 2012 MEAC tournament winner As of March 16, 2012; Rankings from AP Poll

== Bracket ==
First round March 6
8	Hampton	69
9	Morgan State	65
4	Bethune–Cookman	62
13	South Carolina State	53
5	North Carolina Central	60
12	Maryland Eastern Shore	43
7	North Carolina A&T	50
10	Howard	51
6	Coppin State	72
11	Florida A&M	74

Quarterfinals; March 7 and March 8
1	Savannah State	46
8	Hampton	59
4	Bethune–Cookman	60
5	North Carolina Central	59
2	Norfolk State	71
10	Howard	61
3	Delaware State	55^{OT}
11	Florida A&M	65

Semifinals; March 9
8	Hampton	72
4	Bethune–Cookman	81
2	Norfolk State	58
11	Florida A&M	46

Championship game March 10
4	Bethune–Cookman	70
2	Norfolk State	73
