= Horace Broadnax =

American college basketball coach

Current position
- Record: 223–289 (.436)

Biographical details
- Born: March 22, 1964 (age 62); Plant City, Florida, U.S.

Playing career
- 1982–1986: Georgetown
- Position: Point guard

Coaching career (HC unless noted)
- 1992–1993: Florida A&M (assistant)
- 1993–1994: Bethune–Cookman (assistant)
- 1995–1997: Valencia CC
- 1997–2002: Bethune–Cookman
- 2005–2025: Savannah State

Head coaching record
- Overall: 283–397 (.416) (college); 29–31 (.483) (junior college)
- Tournaments: 0–1 (NIT); 0–2 (CIT)

Accomplishments and honors

Championships
- 2 MEAC regular season (2012, 2018); 1 SIAC tournament (2022)

Awards
- 3× MEAC Coach of the Year (1999, 2000, 2012)

Horace Randall Broadnax (born March 22, 1964) is an American college basketball coach. He was most recently the head men's basketball coach at Savannah State University. He was born in Plant City, Florida.

== Playing career ==
After graduating from Plant City High School in his native Plant City, Florida, Broadnax played college basketball at Georgetown University and was a member of the 1984 NCAA Division I men's national championship team. During his four years as a member of the Hoyas the team compiled a 115–24 record. He was also a member of the 1985 NCAA Division I men's national championship runner-up team.

== Coaching career ==
=== Assistant coaching positions ===
Broadnax began his coaching career in 1992 as an assistant at Florida A&M. In the 1993–94 season, he was an assistant at Bethune-Cookman. The following season, he was video coordinator at Florida.

=== Valencia Community College ===
As head coach for Valencia Community College (1995–1997) Broadnax compiled a 29–31 record including the school's first 20 win season in the 1996–1997 season.

=== Bethune–Cookman ===
Returning to Bethune-Cookman in 1997 as head coach, Broadnax was twice selected as the Mid-Eastern Athletic Conference (MEAC) Coach of the Year (1999 and 2000). On February 1, 2002, with Bethune-Cookman at 6–12 (3–7 MEAC), Broadnax resigned as head coach to resume his legal career. Assistant coach Clifford Reed became interim head coach and was promoted to long-term head coach after the season.

=== Savannah State ===
Broadnax became the men's head basketball coach in 2005. In his sixth year as the head coach of the Tigers, he was named the MEAC Coach of the Year as he guided his team to a 14–2 conference record and their first MEAC regular season title. Savannah State posted a 21–10 overall mark and lead the MEAC in scoring defense, only allowing 58.9 points per game and were second in the conference in scoring margin (+5.4).

== Legal career ==
Broadnax became a member of the Florida Bar in 1993 after obtaining his J.D. degree from Florida State University College of Law in Tallahassee, Florida in 1991 and was a law partner at an Orlando law firm. As of 2016, he was listed as an attorney with the Law Office of Joseph Williams in Plant City, Florida.

== Head coaching record ==
=== Junior college ===
Record table
Season	Team	Overall	Conference	Standing	Postseason
Valencia Matadors (Mid-Florida Conference) (1995–1997)
1995–96	Valencia	9–21			
1996–97	Valencia	20–10			
Valencia:		29–31 (.483)			
Total:		29–31 (.483)			
National champion Postseason invitational champion Conference regular season champion Conference regular season and conference tournament champion Division regular season champion Division regular season and conference tournament champion Conference tournament champion

=== College ===
Record table
Season	Team	Overall	Conference	Standing	Postseason
Bethune-Cookman Wildcats (Mid-Eastern Athletic Conference) (1997–2002)
1997–98	Bethune-Cookman	1–26	1–17	10th	
1998–99	Bethune-Cookman	11–16	10–9	5th	
1999–00	Bethune-Cookman	14–15	12–6	4th	
2000–01	Bethune-Cookman	10–19	5–13	9th	
2001–02	Bethune-Cookman	6–12	3–7	(resigned)	
Bethune-Cookman:		42–88 (.323)	31–52 (.373)		
Savannah State Tigers (NCAA Division I independent) (2005–2011)
2005–06	Savannah State	2–28			
2006–07	Savannah State	12–18			
2007–08	Savannah State	13–18			
2008–09	Savannah State	15–14			
2009–10	Savannah State	11–15			
2010–11	Savannah State	12–18			
Savannah State Tigers (Mid-Eastern Athletic Conference) (2011–2019)
2011–12	Savannah State	21–12	14–2	1st	NIT First Round
2012–13	Savannah State	19–15	11–5	3rd	CIT First Round
2013–14	Savannah State	0–19*	0–6*	5th	
2014–15	Savannah State	6–22*	5–11	T–11th	
2015–16	Savannah State	16–16	9–7	5th	CIT First Round
2016–17	Savannah State	13–16	10–6	5th	
2017–18	Savannah State	5–17*	2–4*	T–1st	
2018–19	Savannah State	11–20	8–8	7th	
Savannah State Tigers (Southern Intercollegiate Athletic Conference) (2019–present)
2019–20	Savannah State	11–12	10–9	3rd (East)	
2020–21	Savannah State	0–3	0–0		
2021–22	Savannah State	15–14	8–9	3rd (East)	NCAA Division II First Round
2022–23	Savannah State	15–11	13–8	2nd (East)	
2023-24	Savannah State	13-14	10-11	5th (East)	
2024-25	Savannah State	5-6	3-4		
Savannah State:		241–309 (.438)	113–81 (.582)		
Total:		283–397 (.416)			
National champion Postseason invitational champion Conference regular season champion Conference regular season and conference tournament champion Division regular season champion Division regular season and conference tournament champion Conference tournament champion

* Due to NCAA violations, 26 wins were vacated on September 17, 2019: 13 from the 2013–14 season, three from the 2014–15 season, and 10 from the 2017–18 season.
