= Shakey Rodriguez =

Cuban-American basketball coach (1952–2020)

Biographical details
- Born: November 29, 1952; Havana, Cuba
- Died: November 4, 2020 (aged 67)
- Education: FIU

Coaching career (HC unless noted)
- 1981–1995: Miami Senior HS
- 1995–2000: FIU

Head coaching record
- Overall: College: 79-66 (.545) 428–62

Accomplishments and honors

Championships
- 5 Florida state titles (1987, 1989–1991, 1993)

Awards
- Coach Rodriguez is the 2nd most winningest coach in the state of Florida with 757 game wins, 5 State Titles and 17 District Championships under his belt.

Marcos “Shakey” Rodriguez (November 29, 1952 – November 4, 2020) was a Cuban-American basketball coach.

Rodriguez graduated from Florida International University (FIU) in 1975 and became junior varsity coach at Miami Senior High School in 1978. He was elevated to head varsity coach in 1981 and led the program for 14 seasons, compiling a record of 428–62 and winning five Florida state titles (1987, 1989, 1990, 1991 and 1993). Rodríguez was hired as head coach by FIU in 1995, becoming the first Hispanic Division I basketball coach NCAA Division I in history. Rodriguez coached the Panthers for five seasons, leading the team to a 79–66 record before resigning in 2000. He later returned to high school coaching at Krop High School and Mater Academy in the Miami area.

Rodriguez died from a brain aneurysm on November 4, 2020, at age 67.

In 2021, The City of Miami Co-Designated the southwest 3rd street along Miami Senior High School as "Marcos 'Shakey' Rodriguez Way" to honor the legacy of Shakey's impact in the community.
