= 2009–10 Savannah State Tigers basketball team =

American college basketball season

2009–10 Savannah State Tigers men's basketball
- Conference: Independent
- Record: 11–15
- Head coach: Horace Broadnax
- Assistant coaches: Jay Gibbons; Clyde Wormley
- Home arena: Tiger Arena

2009–10 NCAA Division I men's basketball independents standings
	Conf.				Overall
Team	W		L	PCT	W		L	PCT
Seattle		–		–	17	–	14	.548
Savannah State		–		–	11	–	15	.423
Winston–Salem State		–		–	12	–	17	.414
Longwood		–		–	12	–	19	.387
Cal State Bakersfield		–		–	7	–	22	.241
North Carolina Central		–		–	7	–	22	.241
SIU Edwardsville		–		–	5	–	23	.179
Rankings from AP Poll

The 2009–10 Savannah State Tigers basketball team competed in American basketball on behalf of Savannah State University. The Tigers competed in the NCAA Division I as an independent and finished the season 11–15. The team played its home games at Tiger Arena in Savannah, Georgia. The Tigers entered the season seeking to improve on the 15–14 record posted in the 2008–09 season, the team's first winning season in 23 years. The fifteen victories were the most since the university moved to Division I in 2002.

== Coaching staff ==
Name	Type	College	Graduating year
Horace Broadnax	Head coach	Georgetown University	1986
Jay Gibbons	Assistant coach	Clayton State University	2003
Clyde Wormley	Assistant coach	The Citadel	2003

== Roster ==
SSU Men's Basketball Current Roster
Head coach: Horace Broadnax
Pos.	No.	Name	Class	Hgt./Wt.	Hometown
G	00	Patrick Hardy	Senior	6–3, 185	Atlanta, GA (Westlake)
G	1	Preston Blackmon	Freshman	6–0, 170	Hopkins, S.C. (Lower Richland)
G	2	Tracy Rankins	Senior	5–10, 180	Queens, NY (Douglas County)
F	3	Mark St. Fort	Sophomore	6–6, 210	Wauchula, FL (Hardee Senior)
F	4	Rod Mitchell	Junior	6–7, 205	Columbus, GA (G.W. Carver)
G	5	Andrew Anderson	Freshman	5–10, 170	Buford, GA (Collins Hill)
F	10	Devin Stowers	Senior	6–4, 205	Hephzibah, GA (Hephzibah)
G	13	Anthony Jones	Junior	6–3, 190	Stone Mountain, GA (Miller Groves)
C	14	Glen Izevbigie	Junior	6–10, 230	London, England (Richmond Academy/Garett)
G/F	20	Jovonni Shuler	Senior	6–4, 180	Lake Placid, FL (Lake Placid)
F	22	Rashad Hassan	Sophomore	6–7, 215	Riverdale, GA (Riverdale)
G	23	Cedric Smith	Freshman	6–3, 180	North Lauderdale, FL (Boyd Anderson)
G	24	Marius Chawa	Freshman	6–3, 196	Atlanta, GA (Central Gwinnett)
F	34	Arnold Louis	Sophomore	6–7, 205	Wauchula, FL (Hardee Senior)
G	54	Darnel Jones	Freshman	6–1, 175	Atlanta, GA (Peachtree Ridge)
G	55	Darius Baugh	Freshman	6–2, 180	Mableton, GA (Hillgrove)

== Player stats ==
Stats current as of

Player	Games	MPG	PPG	RPG	FG %	3P%	FT %	APG	SPG
Rankins, Tracy	26	32.7	13.0	2.7	37.8			1.5	.8
Blackmon, Preston	26	30.5	6.8	2.2	35.1			5.1	1.3
Louis, Arnold	26	26.7	8.9	8.0	57.0			.6	1.2
Hassan, Rashad	26	26.2	11.0	5.5	54.2			.6	.9
Hardy, Patrick	24	28.2	7.2	3.0	41.4			2.4	.2
Mitchell, Rod	24	13.0	2.5	2.2	47.4			.5	.6
Chawa, Marius	23	12.9	2.7	1.9	41.1			.2	.5
Izevbigi, Glen	26	9.3	1.6	1.3	45.5			.1	.1
Anderson, Andrew	24	9.8	1.5	.7	24.0			.4	.4
Baugh, Darius	11	19.5	6.1	2.5	30.3			.7	0.6
Smith, Cedric	11	13.5	3.6	1.4	35.7			.1	.9
Stowers, Devin	15	3.3	.5	.7	25.0			.1	.1
Jones, Darnel	10	2.1	.3	.1	0.0			.1	0.0
Shuler, Jovonni	1	12.0	0.0	2.0	0.0			0.0	1.0

== Schedule ==
Date time, TV	Rank^{#}	Opponent^{#}	Result	Record	Site city, state
November 13*; 8:00 p.m.		Webber International	W 65–51	1–0	Tiger Arena; Savannah, GA
November 16*; 7:00 p.m.		Central Connecticut State	W 45–53	2–0	Tiger Arena; Savannah, GA
November 18*; 7:00 p.m.		at North Florida	L 46–57	2–1	UNF Arena; Jacksonville, FL
November 21*; 1 p.m.		Georgetown	L 63–44	2–2	Tiger Arena; Savannah, GA
November 24*; 7:00 p.m.		Western Illinois	W 52–48	3–2	Tiger Arena; Savannah, GA
November 28*; 5:00 p.m.		vs. Central Connecticut State; Skip Prosser Classic	L 51–44	3–3	McAlister Field House; Charleston, SC
November 29*; 5:00 p.m.		vs. Virginia - Wise; Skip Prosser Classic	W 68–57	4–3	McAlister Field House; Charleston, SC
December 3*; 7 p.m.		at Bowling Green	L 51–59	4–4	Anderson Arena; Bowling Green, OH
December 5*; 3:30 p.m.		at Duquesne; Chuck Cooper Classic	L 44–58	4–5	A. J. Palumbo Center; Pittsburgh, PA
December 12*; 4 p.m.		at St. Bonaventure	L 47–79	4–6	Reilly Center; St. Bonaventure, NY
December 16*; 7:05 p.m.		at Creighton	L 77–62	4–7	Qwest Center; Omaha, NE
December 19*; 7:00 p.m.		at Coastal Carolina	L 91–70	4–8	Kimbel Arena; Conway, SC
December 21*; 7:00 p.m.		Stetson	W 57–46	5–8	Tiger Arena; Savannah, GA
December 29*; 10.00 p.m.		at San Diego	L 63–56	5–9	Jenny Craig Pavilion; San Diego, CA
January 2*; 3:00 p.m.		The Citadel	L 54–47	5–10	Tiger Arena; Savannah, GA
January 4*; 8:00 p.m.		at Western Illinois	L 51–55	5–11	Western Hall; Macomb, IL
January 6*; 7:00 p.m., ESPN360		at Missouri	L 45–74	5–12	Mizzou Arena; Columbia, MO
January 11*; 7:30 p.m.		at Central Connecticut State	W 73–63	6–12	William H. Detrick Gymnasium; Hartford, CT
January 20*; 7:00 p.m.		North Carolina Central	W 46–44 OT	7–12	Tiger Arena; Savannah, GA
January 23*; 2:00 p.m.		Longwood	W 68–66	8–12	Tiger Arena; Savannah, GA
January 25*; 7:00 p.m.		Jacksonville	L 72–68	8–13	Tiger Arena; Savannah, GA
January 30*; 7:00 p.m.		Allen	W 81–62	9–13	Tiger Arena; Savannah, GA
February 6*; 3:00 p.m.		at North Carolina Central	L 65–60	9–14	McClendon-McDougald Gymnasium; Durham, NC
February 15*; 7:00 p.m.		at Stetson	W 82–68	10–14	Edmunds Center; DeLand, FL
February 20*; 2:00 p.m.		at Longwood	L 68–54	10–15	Willett Hall; Farmville, VA
February 26*; 7:00 p.m.		Carver Bible	W 94–68	11–15	Tiger Arena; Savannah, GA
*Non-conference game. ^{#}Rankings from AP Poll. (#) Tournament seedings in parentheses. All times are in Eastern Time.

=== Awards and records ===
==== Awards ====
- Sophomore forward Rashad Hassan was named to the 2010 All-Independent Men's Basketball Team.
