= Larry Rivers (basketball) =

American athlete and coach (1949–2023)

Larry "Gator" Rivers
- Rivers in 1973

Personal information
- Born: May 6, 1949 Savannah, Georgia, U.S.
- Died: April 29, 2023 (aged 73) Savannah, Georgia, U.S.
- Listed height: 6 ft 0 in (1.83 m)

Career information
- High school: Beach (Savannah, Georgia)
- College: Moberly Junior College; Missouri Western State University
- Position: Guard

Career history
- 1973–1986: Harlem Globetrotters

Larry Darnell Rivers (May 6, 1949 – April 29, 2023), also known as Gator Rivers, was an American basketball player, coach, business owner, and civil servant. He performed as a dribbler for the Harlem Globetrotters from 1973 to 1986, eventually taking over the main dribbler role from Curly Neal. As player-coach during his last year with the Globetrotters, he led the team's nationwide search for their first female player.

After stints with two other exhibition basketball teams, Rivers moved back to St. Joseph, Missouri, where he had attended college, and started the Gatorball Academy, teaching basketball skills to children. In 2008, he moved to his native Savannah, Georgia, where he had led the Beach High School basketball team to three state titles. In 2020, he was elected to the Chatham County Commission in Chatham County, Georgia and served in the District 2 seat from 2021 until his death.

== Early life ==
Rivers was born in Savannah, Georgia, on May 6, 1949, when his mother was 13 years old. He first saw The Harlem Globetrotters film at the age of seven and was inspired by the dribbling technique of Marques Haynes. The nickname "Gator" originated while playing pool tag as a child because he was unable to swim as well as his friends.

At the age of 14, Rivers quit school to manage a pool hall, but was persuaded by basketball coach Russell Ellington to re-enroll at Alfred E. Beach High School and live with him for the rest of his high school career.

== Education and early basketball career ==
In 1967, during his sophomore year at Beach High School, Rivers was part of the first all-black team to win a Georgia High School Association championship in any sport; it was the GHSA's first season of desegregation. Playing under Ellington, Rivers went on to lead the Beach High School basketball team to three state titles. In his senior year, he averaged 17 points and 9 assists per game. He also developed a reputation for his dribbling skills, leading to fans calling for "Gator Rivers show time" late in their games once Beach High School had established a sizable lead against their opponents. He graduated in 1969, having gained recognition as an all-city, all-region, and all-state athlete.

Rivers became a small college all-American at Moberly Junior College and went on to play as a guard at Missouri Western State University, then known as Missouri Western State College. During the 1971–1972 season, he averaged 14.6 points per game. In his final season, he averaged 16.4 points per game, and set school records for the most points (429) and most assists (181) in a single season. He was selected as an all-conference guard, and received an all-American honorable mention.

In 1973, the St. Joseph Gazette called Rivers "the most talented ballhandler to ever wear a Missouri Western uniform". Rivers later said that he chose the school, despite the snow and ice, in part because the Midwest promoter for the Harlem Globetrotters lived in St. Joseph, Missouri.

== Exhibition basketball career ==
=== Harlem Globetrotters ===
In March 1973, Rivers impressed the Harlem Globetrotters during a tryout in Topeka, Kansas. Both "Clown Prince" Meadowlark Lemon and Curly Neal praised his natural talent, while Tex Harrison later recalled that Rivers "was doing things it takes other players four or five years to be accomplished at." Rivers frequently told the story of how Marcus Haynes had tested his dribbling skills in a folding-chair closet, and how he had dribbled around chairs and under tables to demonstrate his ability to control the ball around obstacles. At 6 ft (1.83 m) in height, Rivers was the shortest member of the Globetrotters when he joined. He toured with Globetrotters from 1973 to 1977 and took a two-year hiatus to assist with coaching and recruiting at Missouri Western, rejoining the Globetrotters in 1979.

For many years, Rivers shared routines with Curly Neal, until Neal was sidelined due to injury and Rivers took over in the main dribbler role in 1982 at the age of 32. That year, the Harlem Globetrotters became the first sports team to be honored with a star on the Hollywood Walk of Fame. Rivers partnered with a Burger King franchise to create the "Burger King / Gator Rivers Basketball Scholarship" at Missouri Western. In 1984, he appeared with four other Globetrotters in an episode of The Love Boat.

In 1985, Rivers started his first year as a player-coach with the Globetrotters, and worked with his former coach Russell Ellington. Rivers led tryouts during the Globetrotters' nationwide search for one or two female players to perform alongside the men for the first time in their 60-year history. However, in 1986, Rivers left the Globetrotters, citing his disillusionment with their direction under new management. One of his frustrations was that while he had been searching for a highly skilled female player who could play with the male players and be respected, Globetrotter management instead went with a player they had in mind from the start, who had publicly stated that she would not have been able to "make it" in the NBA.

=== Shooting Stars ===
In February 1986, Rivers joined the Shooting Stars, a new exhibition basketball team formed by Meadowlark Lemon. The team also featured other former Globetrotters such as Curly Neal, Jerry "Lovebug" Venable, and former NBA star Pete Maravich. Rivers and the team were invited to the White House, where they announced the start of their 1986 Commitment With a Purpose Tour and their support of First Lady Nancy Reagan's campaign encouraging children to "Just Say No" to drugs.

=== Basketball Magic ===
By January 1987, Rivers had signed with a new team called Basketball Magic, along with six other former Harlem Globetrotters, Louis "Sweet Lou" Dunbar, Jimmy Blacklock, Ovie Dotson, Osborne Lockhart, Billy Ray Hobbley, and Robert "Baby Face" Page. The team had formed after several players from the 1985–1986 Harlem Globetrotters starting lineup were unable to agree on a new contract with management.

== Coaching and other ventures ==
=== Gatorball Academy ===
After retiring from touring, Rivers eventually returned to St. Joseph, Missouri, and lived for a few years in King City. In 1990, he founded Gatorball Academy, where he taught basketball rules and skills to children between the ages of 9 and 14. He also volunteered as a youth basketball coach, and was a popular speaker at local elementary schools. He would often invite children to try to steal the ball from him while he was dribbling, but maintained that they never succeeded.

=== High school coaching ===
In the early 1990s, Rivers coached basketball at Bishop LeBlond High School with a 110–25 record over five seasons, and led the team to the Missouri Class 2A final four in the 1993–1994 season. In 1995, he became head coach at Troy High School across the Missouri River in Kansas where his stepdaughter played basketball.

=== The Paris Club ===
In March 1996, Rivers became owner and manager of the Paris Club, a nightclub on Felix Street in downtown St. Joseph featuring both DJ and live music, which he ran with his then-wife Rita. He told the St. Joseph News-Press that year that he envisioned developing an atmosphere similar to The Apollo In Harlem. By 1999, the club had moved from its original location and changed its name.

== Community involvement and political career ==
In 1999, Rivers was inducted into the Greater Savannah Athletic Hall of Fame, and moved back to Savannah, Georgia, permanently in 2008. He continued to run Gatorball Academy training sessions to teach basketball skills to young players and led a campaign to rebuild and improve outdoor basketball courts in neighborhoods across Savannah, such as the one at Crawford Court. He also volunteered with the Frank Callen Boys and Girls Club.

In 2020, Rivers ran as a Republican for Chatham County Commission District 2 in Georgia and was declared the technical winner after Democratic candidate Tony Riley was disqualified due to a past felony conviction.During campaigning, Rivers claimed that he was running as a Republican to avoid having to run in the Democratic primary. He expressed interest in bringing a professional basketball team, as well as soccer and hockey teams, to Savannah to help boost the local economy. According to Chatham County Commission chairman Chester A. Ellis, "As a Commissioner, his passion was ensuring that residents have food security and improving quality of life."

== Death and legacy ==
Rivers died of cancer on April 29, 2023, at the age of 73. His memorial service at St. Paul CME Church in Savannah was attended by hundreds who paid tribute to his dedication to their city, his advocacy of community basketball courts, and his mission to help young people succeed.

On May 12, the Chatham County Commission appointed his wife Jean Brown Rivers to fill his seat until a special election could be held on September 19. Malinda Hodge, a former member of the County Board of Elections, was elected to finish his term in a runoff election on October 17.
