= Savannah State Tigers basketball =

Savannah State Tigers
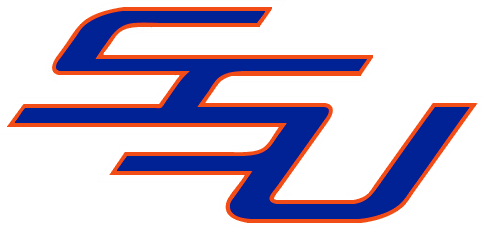
- University: Savannah State University
- Head coach: Clevan Thompson (1st season)
- Location: Savannah, Georgia
- Arena: Tiger Arena (capacity: 6,000)
- Conference: SIAC
- Nickname: Tigers
- Colors: Burnt orange and reflex blue

NCAA Division I tournament appearances
- Division II: 2022, 2025; Division III: 1979, 1980, 1981

Conference tournament champions
- 1970, 2022, 2025

Conference regular-season champions
- 1970, 1979, 1980, 1981, 2012, 2018

Uniforms
Home	Away	Alternate

The Savannah State Tigers basketball team represents Savannah State University and competes in NCAA Division II as a member of the Southern Intercollegiate Athletic Conference since July 2019. The Tigers play their home games in Tiger Arena on the university's Savannah, Georgia campus.

They are currently coached by Clevan Thompson who is in his 1st season as interim head coach of the Tigers.

They competed in NCAA Division I in the Mid-Eastern Athletic Conference from 2010 to 2019, but never qualified for the NCAA Division I tournament. On April 17, 2017, the school announced that it would return to Division II due to financial issues associated with competing in Division I. On December 7, 2017, the school announced it would rejoin Division II's Southern Intercollegiate Athletic Conference (SIAC) following the 2018–19 academic year, pending NCAA approval. Since joining the SIAC in the 2019–2020 academic year, the Tigers have won a SIAC Conference Championship (2021) and made an NCAA Division II national tournament appearance (2021).

== History ==
=== Conference championships and NCAA playoffs ===
Prior to moving into the NCAA, the Tigers appeared in post season play in the NAIA collegiate level. The Tigers appeared in 3 NAIA National Men's Basketball National Tournaments in 1960, 1961, and 1962 with a total combined tournament record of 2–3.

Before moving to Division I the team won the Southern Intercollegiate Athletic Conference championship in 1970, 1979, 1980, and 1981.

The 1978–79 Tigers won an overtime game against Albany (NY) (82–81) in the first round of the NCAA Division III playoffs, but lost in the second round to Centre College (82–54).

In the 1980 Division III playoffs, the Tigers defeated UNC Greensboro in the first round (61–58) before losing to Lane College in the regional championships (87–70).

The 1980–81 Tigers won the SIAC Division III Championship and the NCAA South Regional Championship before finishing the season as the NCAA Division III South Quarterfinal runner-up. During this run they defeated the Rose-Hulman Institute of Technology in the first round (76–62), and Rhodes College in the regional championships (76–75) before losing an overtime game to Otterbein College in the quarterfinals (67– 64).

=== Division I ===
The school gained notoriety when they finished the 2004–05 season a winless 0–28, the first Division I team to do so since Prairie View A&M in 1991–92.

Horace Broadnax became the men's head basketball coach in 2005. In his sixth year as the head coach of the Tigers, the 2011–12 season, he was named the MEAC Coach of the Year as he guided the team to a 14–2 conference record and the school's first MEAC regular season title.

The Tigers were the 2011–12 MEAC regular season champions and received an automatic bid into the 2012 NIT, their first ever appearance in any Division I tournament as a Division I member. The team posted a 21–10 overall mark and lead the MEAC in scoring defense, only allowing 58.9 points per game and were second in the conference in scoring margin (+5.4).

The Tigers were ineligible for postseason play in the 2016–17 season due to APR violations. The Tigers were initially ruled to be ineligible for postseason play for a second consecutive season in 2017–18 due to APR violations. However, the NCAA granted the Tigers a waiver which would allow them to participate in postseason play.

On April 17, 2017, the school announced that it would return to Division II due to financial issues associated with competing in Division I. On December 7, 2017, the school announced it would rejoin Division II's SIAC, pending NCAA approval.

== NCAA records ==
Savannah State set the NCAA records for fewest points in a half (4 points) and the worst field goal percentage in a half (4.3 percent) in an 85–25 loss to Kansas State on January 7, 2009. The Tigers completed the second half 1-for-23, breaking the shot-clock era record.

== Postseason ==
=== NCAA Division II ===
The Tigers have appeared in the NCAA Division II Tournament twice.

Year	Round	Opponent	Result
2022	First round	Nova Southeastern	L, 62–113
2025	First round	Nova Southeastern	L, 64-76

=== NCAA Division III ===
The Tigers have appeared in the NCAA Division III Tournament three times. Their combined record is 4–2.

Year	Round	Opponent	Result
1979	Regional semifinals Regional Finals	Albany; Centre	W 82–81; L 54–82
1980	Regional semifinals Regional Finals	UNC Greensboro; Lane	W 61–58; L 70–87
1981	Regional semifinals Regional Finals; Elite Eight	Rose–Hulman; Southwestern (TN); Otterbein	W 76–62; W 76–75; L 64–67 ^{OT}

=== NAIA tournament results ===
The Tigers have appeared in the NAIA Tournament three times. Their combined record is 2–3.

Year	Round	Opponent	Result
1960	First round Second Round	Willamette; Texas State	W 85–71; L 88–101
1961	First round	Redland	L 80–89
1962	First round Second Round	Pacific Lutheran; Northern Arizona	W 84–75; L 91–95

=== NIT results ===
The Tigers have appeared in the National Invitation Tournament (NIT) one time. Their record is 0–1.

Year	Round	Opponent	Result
2012	First round	Tennessee	L 51–65

=== CIT results ===
The Tigers have appeared in the CollegeInsider.com Postseason Tournament (CIT) two times. Their combined record is 0–2.

Year	Round	Opponent	Result
2013	First round	East Carolina	L 65–66
2016	First round	Texas–Arlington	L 59–75

== Season by season record ==
Conference regular season Champions Conference tournament champions Conference Tournament and regular season champions

Season	Wins	Losses	Conference Record	Head Coach	Conference	References
2011–12	21	11	14–2	Horace Broadnax	MEAC	
2010–11	12	18		Horace Broadnax	Division I Independent	
2009–10	11	15		Horace Broadnax	Division I Independent	
2008–09	15	14		Horace Broadnax	Division I Independent	
2007–08	13	18		Horace Broadnax	Division I Independent	
2006–07	12	18		Horace Broadnax	Division I Independent	
2005–06	2	28		Horace Broadnax	Division I Independent	
2004–05	0	28		Ed Daniels	Division I Independent	
2003–04	4	23		Ed Daniels	Division I Independent	
2002–03	3	23		Ed Daniels	Division I Independent	
2001–02	2	26		Jack Grant	Division 2 Independent	
2000–01	4	21		Jack Grant	Division 2 Independent	
1999–2000	8	18		Samuel Jackson	Division 2 Independent	
1998–99	9	18	4–11	Jacques Curtis	SIAC	
1997–98	11	16	6–9	Jacques Curtis	SIAC	
1996–97				Jimmie Westley	SIAC	
1995–96				Jimmie Westley	SIAC	
1994–95				John Williams	SIAC	
1993–94				John Williams	SIAC	
1992–93				John Williams	SIAC	
1991–92				John Williams	SIAC	
1990–91				John Williams	SIAC	
1989–90				Robert Eskew	SIAC	
1988–89				Robert Eskew	SIAC	
1987–88				Robert Eskew	SIAC	
1986–87				Jimmie Westley	SIAC	
1985–86				Jimmie Westley	SIAC	
1984–85				Jimmie Westley	SIAC	
1983–84				Russell Ellington	SIAC	
1982–83				Russell Ellington	SIAC	
1981–82				Russell Ellington	SIAC	
1980–81				Russell Ellington	SIAC	
1979–80				Russell Ellington	SIAC	
1978–79				Russell Ellington	SIAC	
1977–78				Russell Ellington	SIAC	
1976–77				Russell Ellington	SIAC	
1975–76				Mike Backus	SIAC	
1974–75				Mike Backus	SIAC	
1973–74				Mike Backus	SIAC	
1972–73				Mike Backus	SIAC	
1971–72				Mike Backus	SIAC	
1970–71				Leo Richardson	SIAC	
1969–70				Leo Richardson	SIAC	
1968–69				Leo Richardson	Division 3 Independent	
1967–68				Leo Richardson	Division 3 Independent	
1966–67				Leo Richardson	Division 3 Independent	
1965–66				Leo Richardson	Division 3 Independent	
1964–65				Leo Richardson	Division 3 Independent	
Totals				NCAA Division I Independent results		
Totals				NCAA Division II results		
Totals				NCAA Division III results		
Totals				NAIA results		
Totals	500	670		Regular season results		
Totals	4	3		Playoff results		
Totals	504	677		All games including playoffs		

== Notable alumni ==
Name	Class year	Notability	Reference(s)
Johnny Mathis	1967	Former American Basketball Association forward for the New Jersey Americans	

Six Savannah State alumni became members of the Harlem Globetrotters:

- Tyrone "Hollywood" Brown
- Harold "Bobo" Hubbard
- Matt "Showbiz" Jackson
- Mike Jordan
- Kevin Sutlon
- Vincent White
