= Joey Cantens =

American basketball player and coach

Current position
- Title: Head coach
- Team: FIU Panthers
- Conference: Conference USA

Biographical details
- Born: December 12, 1986 (age 39); Miami, Florida, U.S.
- Education: Eckerd College (2009)

Playing career
- 2005–2006: FIU
- 2006–2009: Eckerd

Coaching career (HC unless noted)
- 2009–2011: Florida State (GA)
- 2011–2014: Florida Gulf Coast (DOBO)
- 2014: Leones de Santo Domingo (assistant)
- 2014–2015: USC (director of scouting)
- 2015–2016: Indiana (PA) (assistant)
- 2016–2017: White Wings Hanau (assistant)
- 2017–2018: MHP Riesen Ludwigsburg (assistant)
- 2018–2021: Florida Gulf Coast (assistant)
- 2021–2026: Daytona State
- 2026–present: FIU

Joey Cantens (born December 12, 1986) is an American college basketball coach, currently serving as the head coach for Florida International University. He previously was head coach at Daytona State College and an assistant coach for several collegiate and professional teams.

== Early life and education ==
Cantens started playing college basketball at FIU before transferring to Eckerd College. He graduated from Eckerd in 2009 with a business management degree and completed his master of science in Sport Management from Florida State University in 2011.

== Coaching career ==
=== Florida State (2009–2011) ===
Cantens worked as a graduate assistant for the Florida State Seminoles men's basketball program under coach Leonard Hamilton from 2009 to 2011. Florida State advanced to the NCAA Tournament both seasons, highlighted by a Sweet Sixteen run in 2011.

=== Florida Gulf Coast (2011–2014) ===
In 2011, Cantens joined the Florida Gulf Coast Eagles men's basketball staff as director of basketball operations under Andy Enfield. Cantens spent three seasons with the team, which included the Eagles’ unprecedented Sweet 16 run in 2013, and their first-ever Atlantic Sun Conference regular season title in 2014 under head coach Joe Dooley.

=== Dominican Republic national basketball team (2014) ===
Cantens also served on the staff of the Dominican Republic national basketball team in 2014, which competed at the 2014 FIBA Basketball World Cup in Spain. Kentucky assistant coach Orlando Antigua led the team to a No. 20 world ranking. Cantens also worked under Kentucky coach John Calipari, who served as the Dominican Republic national team coach during the summers of 2011–13. Calipari's staff led the Dominican Republic to its best finish in the FIBA Americas Championship, earning a bronze medal in 2011.

=== USC (2014–2015) ===
Cantens spent the 2014–15 season as Director of Scouting and Video Operations for the USC Trojans. Cantens rejoined head coach Andy Enfield after working with him at Florida State and Florida Gulf Coast. Prior to joining USC's staff, Cantens served as an assistant coach with Leones de Santo Domingo, a professional team in the Dominican Republic. In Santo Domingo, he assisted long-time Puerto Rico national basketball team coach Flor Meléndez, helping the team advance to the league semifinals.

=== IUP (2015–2016) ===
Cantens served as the top assistant coach under Joe Lombardi for the IUP Crimson Hawks during the 2015–16 season. The Crimson Hawks earned the PSAC West regular season championship, the program's sixth overall.

=== White Wings Hanau (2016–2017) ===
In 2016–17, he served as assistant coach at German second-division side White Wings Hanau, followed by one year as assistant coach of MHP Riesen Ludwigsburg in Germany's top-tier Bundesliga, working under head coach John Patrick.

=== San Antonio Spurs (2018) ===
In the summer of 2018, Cantens was a member of the San Antonio Spurs' coaching staff at the Utah Summer League. In July 2018, he returned to the Florida Gulf Coast University's men's basketball program to serve as assistant under head coach Michael Fly.

=== Daytona State (2021–2026) ===
In June 2021, Cantens accepted the head coach position at Daytona State College. He inherited a program with just 7 win the previous year and quickly improved that win total to 11 in the 2021-2022. With a full recruiting class the second year, Cantens improved to 27 wins and were Central Conference Champions in Florida's NJCAA Region 8. DSC was ranked as high as 8th in the Nation for NJCAA. Cantens earned Conference Coach of the Year Honors and had 6 players earn All-Conference honors including the Player of the Year.

Cantens also served as an assistant coach for AAU program Team Breakdown.

=== FIU (2026–present) ===
In March 2026, Cantens was hired as the head coach at FIU.

== Head coaching record ==
Record table
Season	Team	Overall	Conference	Standing	Postseason
Daytona State Falcons (Mid-Florida Conference) (2021–2026)
2021-22	Daytona State	11–19	3–12	5th	
2022-23	Daytona State	27–4	14–1	1st	NJCAA South Atlantic District Quarterfinals
2023-24	Daytona State	28–4	14–2	T-1st	NJCAA Tournament First Round
2024-25	Daytona State	28–6	14–2	1st	NJCAA Tournament Quarterfinals
2025-26	Daytona State	27–8	13–3	T-1st	NJCAA Tournament Second Round
Daytona State:		121–41 (.747)	58–20 (.744)		
FIU Panthers (Conference USA) (2026–present)
2026–27	FIU	0–0	0–0		
FIU:		0–0 (–)	0–0 (–)		
Total:		121–41 (.747)			
National champion Postseason invitational champion Conference regular season champion Conference regular season and conference tournament champion Division regular season champion Division regular season and conference tournament champion Conference tournament champion

== Personal life ==
Cantens is married to Mel Thomas, with whom he has a daughter and son.
