= Beach Institute African-American Cultural Center =

Museum and cultural center in Savannah, Georgia, United States

Beach Institute
- The Beach Institute African-American Cultural Center
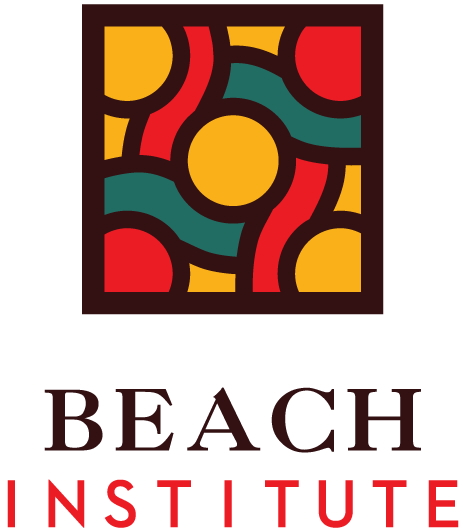

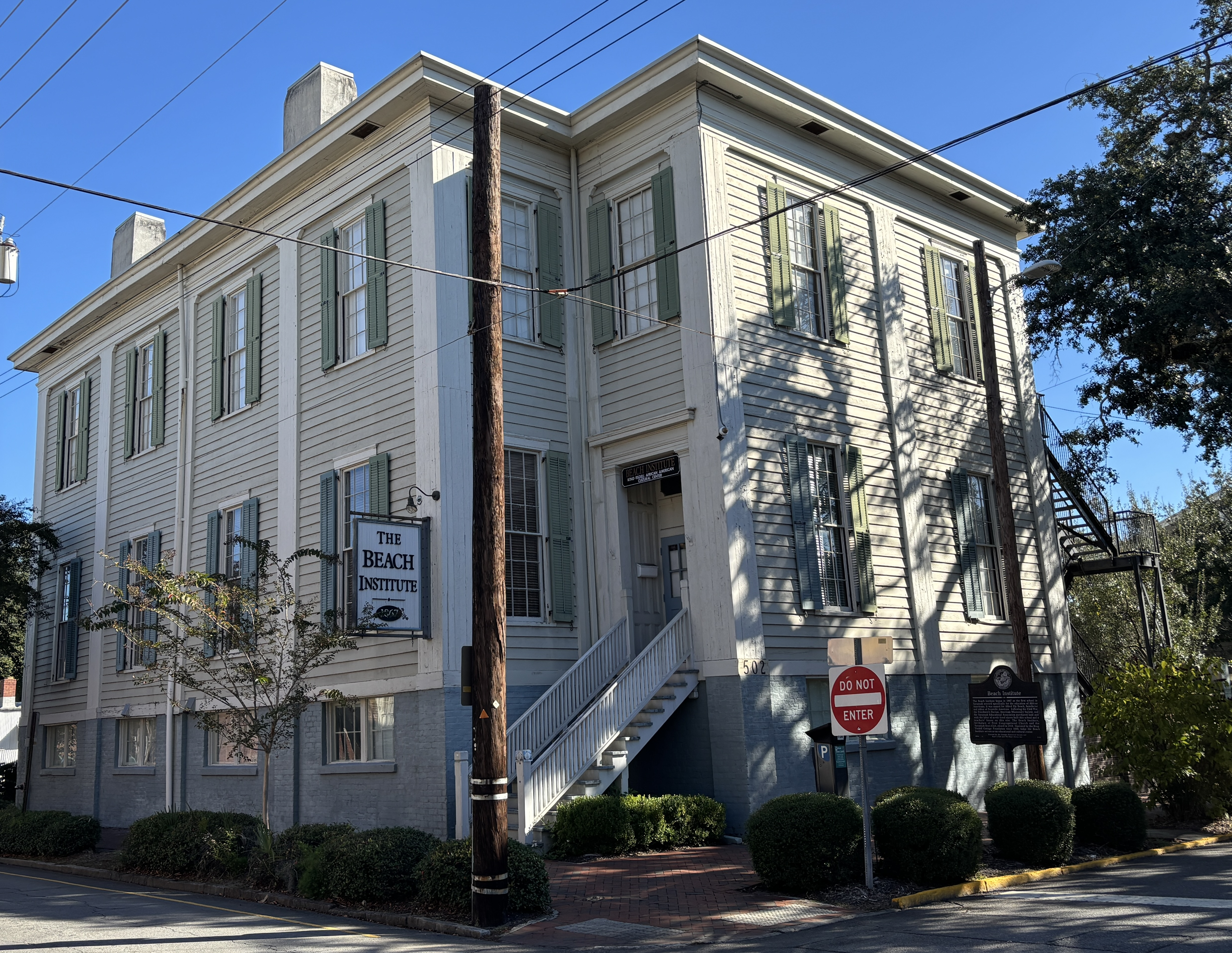
- Building along Harris and Prince Streets
- Nickname: Beach Institute
- Named after: Alfred Ely Beach
- Established: 1990; 36 years ago
- Founder: W.W. Law
- Type: Nonprofit
- Purpose: Cultural center & museum
- Location: 502 E Harris Street, Savannah, Georgia 31401
- Main organ: King-Tisdell Cottage Foundation
- Website: beachinstitute.org

Beach Institute
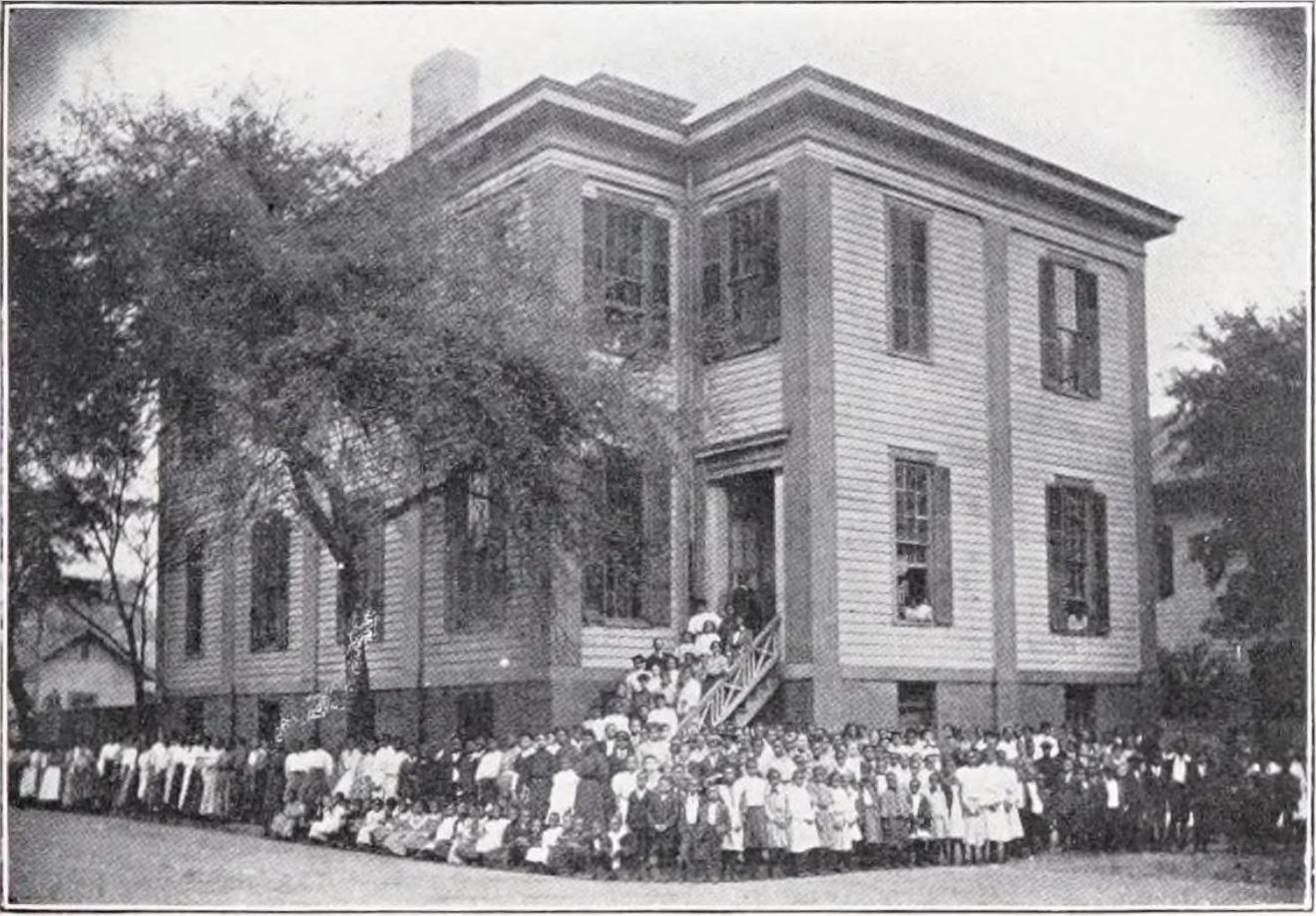
- The building in c.1910.

General information
- Architectural style: Victorian
- Location: 502 E Harris Street, Savannah, Georgia 31401
- Coordinates: 32.0726°N 81.0885°W
- Completed: 1868 (158 years ago)
- Cost: $13,000
- Owner: American Missionary Association

Technical details
- Floor count: 2-3

Design and construction
- Architect: John Boutell

The Beach Institute African-American Cultural Center is a cultural institution in Savannah, Georgia, focused on preserving, researching, and presenting African American history and culture. It operates within the historic Beach Institute building, located in Savannah's Historic District which is listed on the National Register of Historic Places. The building was originally constructed in 1867 as one of the first schools for African Americans in Savannah following the Civil War. The center hosts exhibitions, educational programs, and community events that explore African American heritage and art, serving as a focal point for cultural preservation and public education in the city.

== Museum and exhibits ==
The center contains galleries that present collections and exhibitions focused on African American history and culture. The permanent Davis Collection, housed within the John B. & Mozelle D. Clemmons Galleries, consists of over 240 wood sculptures by folk artist Ulysses Davis. The center also hosts rotating exhibitions, featuring contemporary artists whose work explores African American themes. The Grand Gallery displays changing exhibits and serves as a space for cultural programming and events. Past exhibitions have addressed topics such as Black cultural traditions, spiritual folk art, and historical narratives from the Savannah area.

== Educational programming ==
The center offers educational programming aimed at increasing public knowledge and appreciation of African American history and culture. Programs include guided tours of the museum and exhibits, lectures, workshops, and special seminars. The Beach Institute provides genealogy assistance to support personal and community history research. It also organizes public events and partnerships with schools and organizations to foster cultural learning. Topics covered include the Gullah-Geechee heritage, food justice, and historic preservation.

== Beach Institute building ==
The Beach Institute was established in 1867 in Savannah, Georgia, as a school for African Americans after the Civil War. It was built by the Freedmen's Bureau with major funding from the American Missionary Association (AMA). The institute was named for Alfred E. Beach, editor of Scientific American, who donated money for the property. Architect John Boutell designed the two-story frame building with eight classrooms accommodating eighty students each, and a chapel for five hundred. Its raised basement, wooden pilasters, hipped roof, and a prominent pedimented gable on the Harris Street side created a distinctive appearance. When it opened, about 600 students enrolled under nine female teachers and a male principal. Most teachers were white, and tuition was one dollar per month in 1873.

In 1874, the Beach Institute was transferred to the Savannah Board of Education and became a free public school for African American children. Four years later, in 1878, a fire damaged the building, temporarily halting classes. The AMA then regained control, aiming to raise the academic standards beyond those maintained by the local school authorities.

For several decades, the institute remained a leading educational site for African American students in Savannah. In 1917, the Savannah Boys Club began meeting in one basement room of the building. The club soon expanded, occupying the entire basement and holding educational programs for African American boys throughout the week. Black children who attended the Beach Institute could not attend schools designated for white children in Savannah because city and state laws required racial segregation in public education during this period. Schools in Savannah were separated by race, and Black children were only allowed to attend schools built for African American students.

=== Closure ===
In 1919, the Beach Institute closed after enrollment declined, as local African American students attended newer schools, including Savannah's first African American public high school and the Georgia State Industrial College at Thunderbolt. In 1939, the Chatham County Board of Education took over the Beach Institute from the AMA to operate it as a public school for Black children until 1970.

=== Building preservation ===
The Beach Institute building has undergone significant preservation efforts to maintain its historic and cultural importance. After operating for many years as a school, it was taken over by the Chatham County Board of Education. In 1988, when the local school board placed the building up for auction, Paula Wallace, president of the Savannah College of Art and Design (SCAD), purchased it. Inspired by her friend, Savannah civil rights leader W.W. Law, Wallace donated the building to the King-Tisdell Cottage Foundation, which Law headed.

SCAD also funded the labor and materials for the building's exterior renovations, helping restore its original architectural character. Since its reopening in 1990 under the King-Tisdell Cottage Foundation, the Beach Institute has functioned as a cultural center dedicated to researching, preserving, and teaching African American history. It now houses a gallery, lecture hall, and exhibition space that continue the building's legacy as a center for African American art, history, and historic preservation.

=== Rebirth and current role ===
After periods of vacancy and alternative use, the SCAD acquired the site in 1988 and donated it to the King-Tisdell Cottage Foundation. In 1990, the restored Beach Institute reopened as the Beach Institute African-American Cultural Center, dedicated to arts, education, and heritage.

== See also ==
- Beach High School
