= Russell Ellington =

American basketball player and coach (1938–2007)

Biographical details
- Born: February 4, 1938; Wadley, Georgia, U.S.
- Died: September 1, 2007 (aged 69); Savannah, Georgia, U.S.

Playing career
- 1956–1960: Morris Brown

Coaching career (HC unless noted)
- 1962–1976: Alfred E. Beach HS
- 1976–1984: Savannah State
- 1984–1993: Harlem Globetrotters
- 1993–1997: Savannah Tech
- 1997–2000: Morris Brown
- 2005–2007: Alfred E. Beach HS

Head coaching record
- Overall: 181–141 (college)

Accomplishments and honors

Championships
- 3 SIAC; 2 Region XVII Junior College; NJCCA District 10; 4 Georgia high school

Russell Ellington (February 4, 1938 – September 1, 2007) was an American basketball coach. He served as the head basketball coach at Savannah State College—now known as Savannah State University—from 1976 to 1984 and Morris Brown College from 1997 to 2000, compiling a career college basketball coaching record of 181–141. He also coached the Harlem Globetrotters for nine years. His titles as a coach include: four state high school basketball championships; three Southern Intercollegiate Athletic Conference (SIAA) titles; two Region XVII Junior College championships, and one NJCCA District 10 championship.

== Biography ==
=== Early life ===
Ellington grew up in Wadley, Georgia. He began working in cotton fields at age five to help his family, which included eight brothers and sisters. He left home for good by the age of 12, hitching a ride on a freight train to Savannah, Georgia, where his sister lived.

=== Education ===
Russell graduated from Alfred E. Beach High School in Savannah, Georgia, in 1956. He was an academic All-American in football and in basketball at Morris Brown College in Atlanta, Georgia, graduating with a bachelor's degree in biology, with a minor in chemistry, in 1960. He did further studies at University of Georgia and Georgia Southern University.

=== Playing career ===
==== Basketball ====
Ellington was a standout player for Beach High School and Morris Brown college.

==== Professional football ====
Ellington played professional football for the New York Giants for two years before his career was interrupted because of injuries.

== Coaching career ==
=== Beach High School (1962–1976) ===
Ellington was the Beach High School, boys' basketball coach for 15 years, winning 482 of 529 games he coached (91%). His teams won five state championships including the Georgia High School Association Class AAA State Championships during the first season following integration of the Georgia High School Association, 1966–67, the first season black players were allowed to compete. That 1967 team earned the Sports Illustrated magazine national championship.

=== Savannah State (1976–1984) ===
As Savannah State College;'s men's had basketball coach Ellington compiled a 148–91 record (.619 winning percentage). During that time he also was the school's athletics director and a mathematics teacher, overseeing the school's transition from NCAA Division III to Division II in 1981.

He currently holds the record for most wins by a men's basketball coach in Savannah State's history, producing winning records in the final eight of his nine seasons and winning three Southern Intercollegiate Athletic Conference regular season and tournament title during his tenure.

=== Harlem Globetrotters (1984–1993) ===
Ellington toured with the Globetrotters as head coach from 1984 to 1993, traveling to 122 countries with the team.

==== Savannah Tech (1993–1997) ====
Ellington returned to Savannah in 1993 to serve as the first men's head basketball coach and athletic director at Savannah Technical School (College). The team eventually made an appearance in the National Junior College playoffs in Kansas City, Missouri.

==== Morris Brown (1997–2000) ====
Ellington returned as the men's head basketball coach and athletic director at his alma mater, Morris Brown College, in 1997.

==== Beach High School (2005–2007) ====
Ellington returned to coaching in 2005 taking the Bulldogs to the Georgia state quarter-finals with a 28–3 record

== Honors and awards ==
He is a member of the Morris Brown College Hall of Fame (1978). In 1980, he was inducted into the Greater Savannah Athletic Hall of Fame. He also is a member of the Beach High School Hall of Fame (1987) and the Southern Intercollegiate Athletic Conference Hall of Fame (1997). Ellington was inducted into the Georgia Sports Hall of Fame on May 19, 2007.

== Quotes ==
"There are three parts of faith: One is knowledge, another is belief in yourself and the third is to just put it into action."

== Personal life ==
Ellington was married to Betty W. Ellington for 30 years; they had six children.

He was a member of Alpha Phi Alpha fraternity, the Mark Gilbert Civil Rights Museum Board of Directors, the Board of Directors for the West Broad Street YMCA (Savannah, Georgia), the Georgia High School Sports Association, and the South Eastern Quarter Back Club.

Ellington died on September 1, 2007, from lung cancer complications at St. Joseph's Hospital in Savannah, aged 69.
