= Beach High School =

Public high school in Savannah, Georgia, United States

Alfred Ely Beach High School
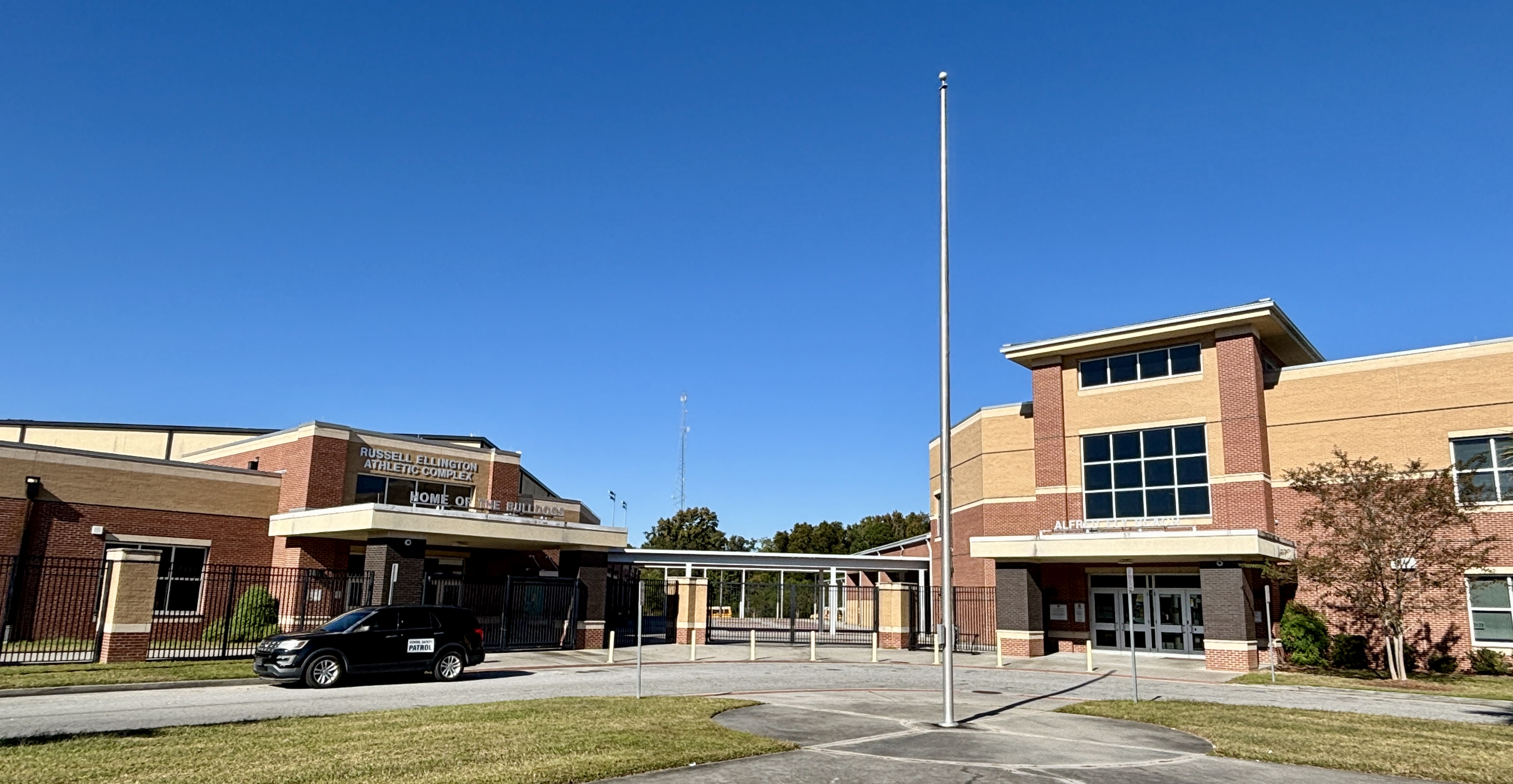

Location
- 3001 Hopkins Street; Savannah, Georgia 31405; United States; 32°03′13″N 81°06′59″W

Information
- Type: Public secondary
- Established: 1867 (159 years ago)
- School district: Savannah-Chatham County Public Schools
- CEEB code: 112670
- Principal: Lisa Linton
- Faculty: 70
- Teaching staff: 61.60 (FTE)
- Grades: 9–12
- Enrollment: 904 (2023-2024)
- Student to teacher ratio: 14.68
- Colors: Blue and gold
- Nickname: Bulldogs and Lady Bulldogs
- Accreditation: Southern Association of Colleges and Schools
- Yearbook: The Golden Bulldog
- Website: beach.sccpss.com

Alfred Ely Beach High School, known as Beach High School, is a public high school in Savannah, Georgia, with a long history tied to African American education in the region.

== History ==
Alfred E. Beach High School in Savannah, Georgia, has undergone four distinct phases since its establishment in 1867, evolving from a private institute to a public high school, serving the education needs of African American students in the region.

=== Beach Institute (1867 to 1919) ===
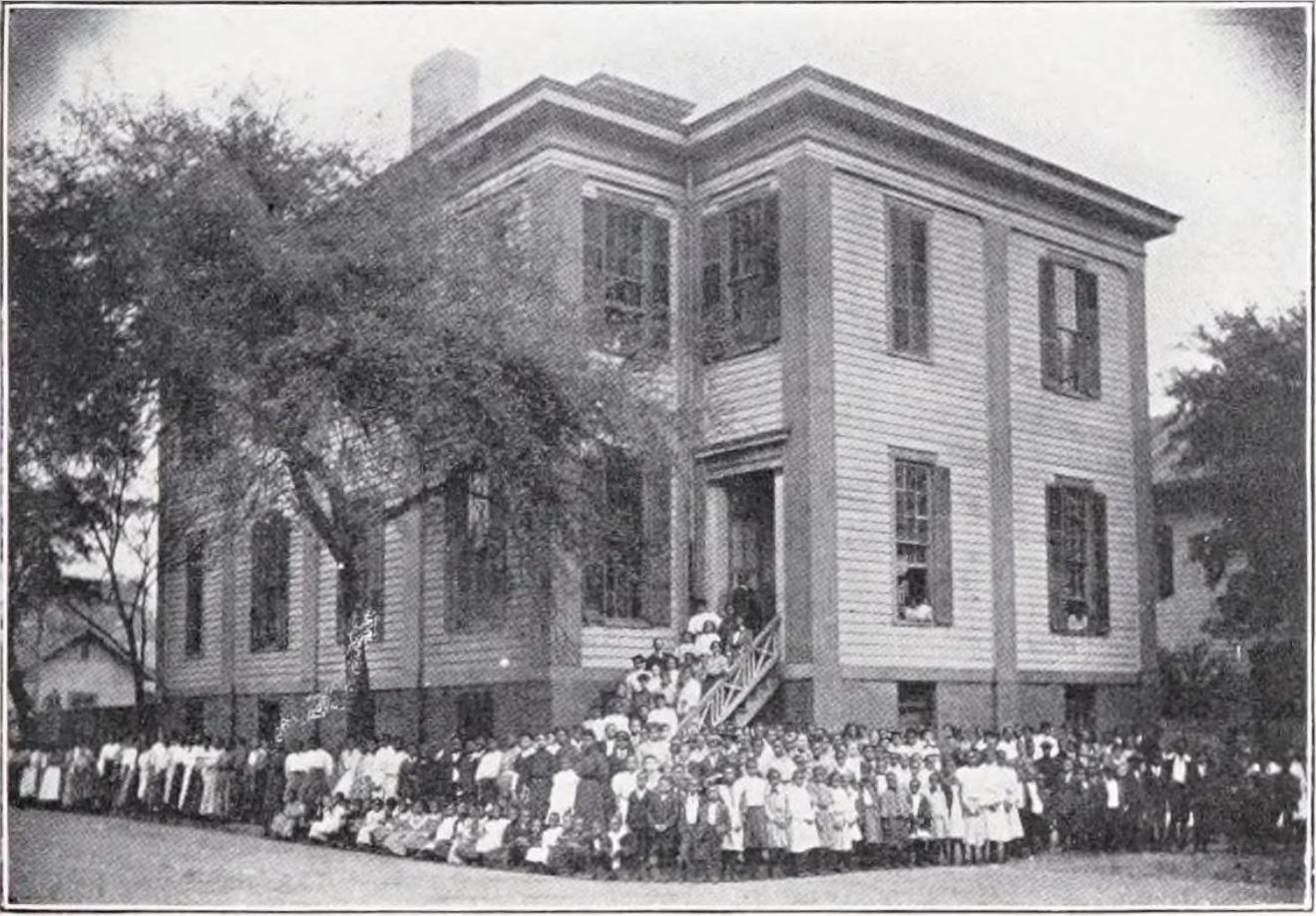
The Beach Institute, c. 1910

The school traces its origins to the Beach Institute, established in 1867 by the American Missionary Association (A.M.A.) and the Freedmen's Bureau. The institute was funded by Alfred Ely Beach, editor of Scientific American, to educate newly freed African Americans after the Civil War.

In 1870, the Chatham County Board of Education sought to assume responsibility for educating black children. After negotiations, the Board rented the Beach Institute building from the AMA in 1874 and reopened it as a public school, still named the Beach Institute. A fire in 1878 forced the relocation of students to the Fair Lawn House on East Broad Street and Gaston Street. Subsequently, a new Beach Institute building was constructed at 502 Harris Street, where the AMA operated it as a junior and senior high school since the public school system did not offer these grades for black children. The AMA managed the school until 1919, when funding shortages and the opening of Cuyler Junior High, the first public junior high school for black students, led to its closure.

=== Beach Continuation School (1922 to 1929) ===
Concerned citizens then prompted the Reverend Arnold Erasmus Gregory to open the Beach Continuation School in 1922, a private high school for black students located in the old Beach Institute building. This school was overseen by the First Congregational Church which had been given the building by the AMA. In 1924, this school was integrated into the Board of Education system, continuing education for black students. However, due to the economic difficulties of the late 1920s and declining enrollment, the Board closed Beach Continuation School in 1929 and merged it with Cuyler Junior High. The resulting institution was Beach Cuyler Senior High School.

=== Beach Cuyler Senior High School (1929 to 1949) ===
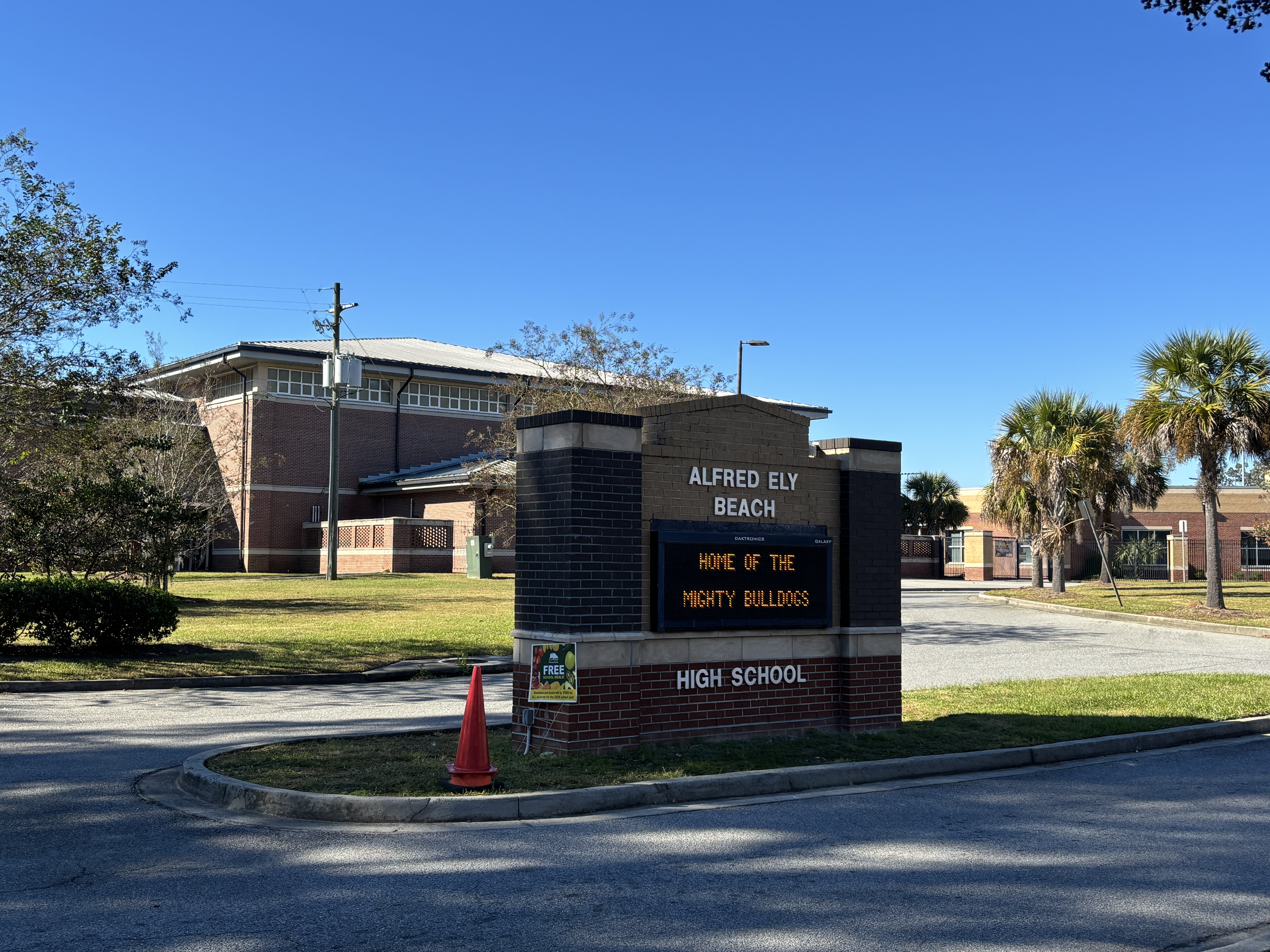
Welcome sign at school entrance

Enrollment at Beach Cuyler grew significantly, leading to overcrowding. In response to community advocacy, the Board of Education in 1949 officially separated the two schools. Cuyler reverted to a junior high school name, and Beach became Alfred E. Beach High School.

=== Alfred E. Beach High School (1950 to present) ===
In 1950, Beach High moved to its current facility at 3001 Hopkins Street. Since then, it has functioned as a public high school for African American students and later for a diverse student body until it was replaced with the new facility opening of the new 200,000-square-foot facility in 2013.

=== March 2000 shooting ===
Beach High School shooting
- Date: March 10, 2000 c. 11:15 p.m. (EDT)
- Weapon: semi-automatic handgun
- Deaths: 2
- Injuries: 1
- Perpetrator: Darrell Ingram
- Motive: Unknown
- Sentence: 2 life terms plus 35 years in prison

On March 10, 2000, 19-year-old Stacy Smalls was shot and killed outside the high school. 16-year-olds Lamar Jenkins and Ramone Kimble were also injured, with Kimble dying in hospital the next morning. The attack followed an after school event celebrating the Lady Bulldogs' state championship victory. Despite school officials stating that the event was restricted to students only, Smalls did not attend the school at the time of the shooting.

In the early hours of the following day, 19-year-old Darrell Ingram was identified as a suspect and arrested. During his trial, it was argued that another person had shot the three students, and Ingram had simply fired into the air as a response. Despite this, he was found guilty of two counts of first-degree murder and one count of aggravated assault.

On November 5, 2000, Ingram was sentenced to two life terms plus 35 years in prison. An earlier request to allow Ingram to undergo a psychological evaluation and IQ test was denied. Despite being interviewed about his crime, a motive for the shooting has never been established.

== Enrollment ==
Beach High School serves students in grades 9 through 12 who reside in Chatham County. The school has an enrollment of about 1,000 students, providing education to a diverse student body from the local area.

== Academics ==
Academics at Alfred E. Beach High School centers on preparation for postsecondary study, employment, and military service.

Curriculum structure

The school uses a college preparatory program with core courses in English, mathematics, science, and social studies that align with state graduation requirements.

Students follow sequences in these subjects that support entry to four year and two year institutions and other postsecondary options.

Academic pathways

The school organizes coursework into academic pathways that structure sequences in core subjects.

These pathways guide course selection for students who plan to pursue college study or other postsecondary plans.

Career and technical integration

Career, Technical, and Agricultural Education pathways operate alongside academic pathways.

Students combine core academic courses with pathway courses in fields that lead to industry credentials or further technical training.

Allied Health Professions program

The Medical and Allied Health Professions program provides a sequence of courses in health science.

Students study medical terminology, healthcare essentials, patient care fundamentals, and responses to emergencies in preparation for entry level positions or further study in health fields.

Performance and recognition

Beach is ranked between 8 and 11 in the Savannah Chatham County Public School District, between 300 and 400 in Georgia schools, and between 13,000 and 17,000 nationally.

In 2010, Beach High School was selected as the recipient of "Outstanding Service By a High School" at the 38th annual Jefferson Awards, an honor for community service and volunteerism.

At the end of the 2009–2010 academic year, the Savannah-Chatham County School District released the school's faculty and staff personnel, citing inadequate academic progress over the previous five years.

== Extracurricular activities ==
=== State championships ===
==== Georgia Interscholastic Association ====
The school won the boys' state basketball championship in 1953, 1963, 1964, and 1965.

==== Georgia High School Association ====
The high school won the first integrated state basketball championship in Georgia in 1967. This victory was significant as it marked the first year African-American players and schools were allowed to compete in the Georgia High School Association (GHSA). The Beach High School boys' basketball team, coached by Russell Ellington, defeated South Fulton in the championship game, marking a historic moment in Georgia high school sports integration. This team and its triumph were widely recognized and celebrated, including coverage by Sports Illustrated. The team was met with a large celebration of 4,000 people upon their return to Savannah.

The Beach High School girls' basketball team won the Georgia state championships in 2000 and 2017. The 2000 championship marked the first state title for a Savannah public school girls' basketball team and was achieved under coach Ronald Booker. The team secured the Georgia High School Association Class 4A title. In 2017, the Lady Bulldogs again won the state championship by defeating Johnson-Savannah in the final.

== Notable alumni ==
Name	Class year	Notability	Reference(s)
Antario Brown	2021	college football running back	
Markeith Cummings	2007	professional basketball player	
Carey Scott	1997	professional football player	
Regina Thomas	1970	Georgia State Senator (2000–present); member of the Georgia House of Representatives (1995 to 1998)	
Larry "Gator" Rivers	1969	Former member of the Harlem Globetrotters	
Otis Johnson	1960	Mayor of Savannah, Georgia (2004–2012)	
Russell Ellington	1956	Former NFL player and basketball coach	

== See also ==
- Beach Institute African-American Cultural Center
