= Anthony Evans (basketball) =

American basketball coach

Current position
- Title: Director of Player Development
- Team: UMass
- Conference: Atlantic 10

Biographical details
- Born: March 25, 1970 (age 56); Brooklyn, New York, U.S.

Playing career
- 1989–1991: Orange County CC
- 1991–1993: St. Thomas Aquinas

Coaching career (HC unless noted)
- 1994–1997: Orange County CC (assistant)
- 1997–1999: SUNY New Paltz (assistant)
- 1999–2001: Ulster County CC
- 2001–2003: SUNY Delhi CC
- 2003–2007: Norfolk State (assistant)
- 2007–2013: Norfolk State
- 2013–2018: Florida International
- 2019–2021: Fordham (assistant)

Head coaching record
- Overall: 164–188 (college)

Accomplishments and honors

Championships
- MEAC tournament (2012); MEAC regular season (2013)

Awards
- Colt Athletic Hall of Fame – Class of 2017

Anthony Lemont Evans (born March 25, 1970) is an American college basketball coach and the former head men's basketball coach at Florida International. Prior to FIU, he served as the head coach at Norfolk State University. Evans currently serves as Director of Player Development at UMass.

Evans graduated from St. Thomas Aquinas College in 1994, where he had played guard for the men's basketball team.

== Playing career ==
Evans played out his high school career at Bishop Loughlin High School in Brooklyn, NY. After graduating from Loughlin, he went on to attend Orange County CC in Middletown, NY where he was a two-year stand out for the Colts during the 1989–1990 & 1990–1991 seasons. He currently is 4th on the SUNY Orange all-time scoring list with 1,182 points. In 2017, he was inducted into the Colt Athletic Hall of Fame. After two successful seasons, he transferred to St. Thomas Aquinas College. He served as a guard on the Spartans basketball team from 1991 to 1993, while earning his bachelor's degree in marketing.

== Early coaching career ==
=== Orange County Community College ===
Anthony Evans began his coaching career at Orange County CC in Middletown, NY as an assistant from 1994 to 1997.

=== Ulster County Community College ===
Evans' first head coaching job was at Ulster County CC, in Kingston, NY. In the 2001 season, Evans led his squad to a 23–8 record and a runner up finish in region XV and was named Region coach of the year.

=== Delhi Tech ===
From 2001 to 2003, Evans coached State University of New York at Delhi to a 62–8 record, including two Region III titles and appearances in the National Junior College Association Division III tournament. He was District I Coach of the Year twice, and Region III Coach of the Year in 2002. His teams at Delhi garnered a No. 1 ranking at one point during both of his years there.

He coached a first-team All-American in 2002–03, and an honorable-mention All-American in 2001–02. Three of his former Delhi players played at Division I schools.

== Norfolk State ==
=== 2003–2007 seasons ===
In 2003, Evans joined the coaching staff at Norfolk State as an assistant coach. His responsibilities included developing guards, scouting opponents and recruiting. Evans was instrumental in the recruitment of several of NSU's top players. Included among them was a pair of 1,000-point scorers and All-MEAC players, guards Tony Murphy and Corey Lyons. Murphy became the school's first three-time All-MEAC player and departed as the program's No. 7 all-time leading scorer.

Murphy and Lyons are just two of the players who have earned conference accolades during Evans’ tenure at NSU. Murphy and fellow guard Michael Deloach were both two-time All-MEAC members during their careers. O’Quinn earned three all-conference designations during his career and also earned NABC All-District honors in 2010–11. Also in 2011–12, senior Chris McEachin was voted to the All-MEAC second team.

After four seasons as an assistant, Evans took over the head coaching job at Norfolk State.

=== 2007–08 season ===
In 2007–08, his first at the helm of the program, Evans guided the Spartans to just their second Division I winning season. The Spartans compiled a 16–15 overall record and finished 11–5 in MEAC play, at the time their most successful regular-season finish since joining the league. NSU also tied for second in the regular-season standings, another high-water mark for the program. NSU advanced to the MEAC tournament semifinals before losing to eventual champion Coppin State. Evans capped his inaugural season by being named MEAC Co-Coach of the Year by CollegeInsider.com

=== 2008–09 season ===
In 2008–09, NSU shook off a slow start to reach the cusp of its first-ever MEAC title. The Spartans rode an up-tempo offense and pressure defense to their first MEAC tournament championship game appearance. Despite falling to Morgan State in the tournament final, the Spartans served notice that they deserve to be mentioned among the conference's elite.

=== 2009–2011 seasons ===
The 2009–10 Spartans finished the year at 9–7 in conference play. And in 2010–11, the Spartans advanced to the MEAC tournament semifinals for the third time in four seasons.

=== 2011–12 season ===
The 26–10 campaign in 2011–12 now stands as the best record ever for NSU during the D-I years, as does the Spartans’ 13–3 conference record. It marked the most overall wins since the 1994–95 season and the most conference victories since 1995–96. In addition, it kept alive NSU's streak of finishing .500 or better in conference play, a streak that began in 1991–92 and includes every year in the MEAC except for a first-season transitional year.

A senior-led squad defeated Howard, Florida A&M and then Bethune-Cookman, 73–70, at the 2012 MEAC Championship to capture the first-ever conference title for the men's program since moving into the MEAC and Division I in 1997. NSU was not done, though, as the No. 15 seed Spartans pulled off one of the biggest upsets ever in NCAA tournament history just six days later.

Facing No. 2 seed Missouri – a team several experts believed would advance to the Final Four and could have been a No. 1 seed – in a West Region matchup on March 16, NSU used its size advantage and a huge game from senior center Kyle O’Quinn to shock the Tigers and the nation in an 86–84 upset in the NCAA second round.

The Spartans became the fifth No. 15 seed (at the time) to defeat a No. 2 seed and the third MEAC school to accomplish the feat. No. 3-ranked Missouri became the highest ranked team to ever lose its first game of an NCAA tournament since the field expanded to 64. The victory over the Big 12 tournament champion Tigers was nominated for “Best Upset” at the 2012 ESPY Awards.

Later on in the summer of 2012, O’Quinn, an unheralded high school player from Queens, New York, whose only D-I scholarship offer was from NSU, was selected by the Orlando Magic with the 49th overall pick in the NBA draft. No Spartan basketball player had been drafted since 1988, and no MEAC player had heard his name called either since 1998.

Evans won several awards. He was named the MEAC tournament's Most Outstanding Coach and!the Clarence “Big House” Gaines Award winner, given out by the National Sportscasters and Sportswriters Association to the top minority basketball coach in Division I.

He also earned HBCU Coach of the Year honors from Boxtorow.com, and Virginia Sports Information Directors (VaSID) Coach of the Year accolades.

As a result of the team's success, Evans, who was in his 10th year overall on the Spartan coaching staff, was rewarded with a contract extension in June 2012 that will keep him with NSU through the 2016–17 season.

=== 2012–13 season ===
Evans guided the Spartans to a 21–12 overall record, including a perfect 16–0 mark in MEAC play, but lost its conference tournament opener to Bethune-Cookman. By virtue of winning the conference regular season, Norfolk State earned a bid to the 2013 NIT where it faced Virginia in the opening round, losing 67–56.

== FIU ==
On April 15, 2013, Evans accepted the job at Florida International, replacing Richard Pitino.

On April 2, 2018, FIU parted ways with Evans after five seasons.

== Head coaching record ==
=== College ===
Record table
| Season | Team | Overall | Conference | Standing | Postseason |
|---|---|---|---|---|---|
Norfolk State Spartans (Mid-Eastern Athletic Conference) (2007–2013)
| 2007–08 | Norfolk State | 16–15 | 11–5 | 2nd | |
| 2008–09 | Norfolk State | 13–18 | 9–7 | 3rd | |
| 2008–10 | Norfolk State | 11–19 | 9–7 | 4th | |
| 2010–11 | Norfolk State | 12–20 | 8–8 | 6th | |
| 2011–12 | Norfolk State | 26–10 | 13–3 | 2nd | NCAA Division I Round of 32 |
| 2012–13 | Norfolk State | 21–12 | 16–0 | 1st | NIT First Round |
| Norfolk State: | | 99–94 (.513) | 66–30 (.688) | | |
FIU Panthers (Conference USA) (2013–2018)
| 2013–14 | FIU | 15–16 | 7–9 | 8th | |
| 2014–15 | FIU | 16–17 | 8–10 | T–7th | |
| 2015–16 | FIU | 13–19 | 7–11 | T–9th | |
| 2016–17 | FIU | 7–24 | 3–15 | 13th | |
| 2017–18 | FIU | 14–18 | 8–10 | T–7th | |
| FIU: | | 65–94 (.409) | 33–55 (.375) | | |
| Total: | | 164–188 (.466) | | | |
National champion Postseason invitational champion Conference regular season champion Conference regular season and conference tournament champion Division regular season champion Division regular season and conference tournament champion Conference tournament champion
