= FIU Panthers men's basketball =

Men's college basketball team

FIU Panthers
2026–27 FIU Panthers men's basketball team
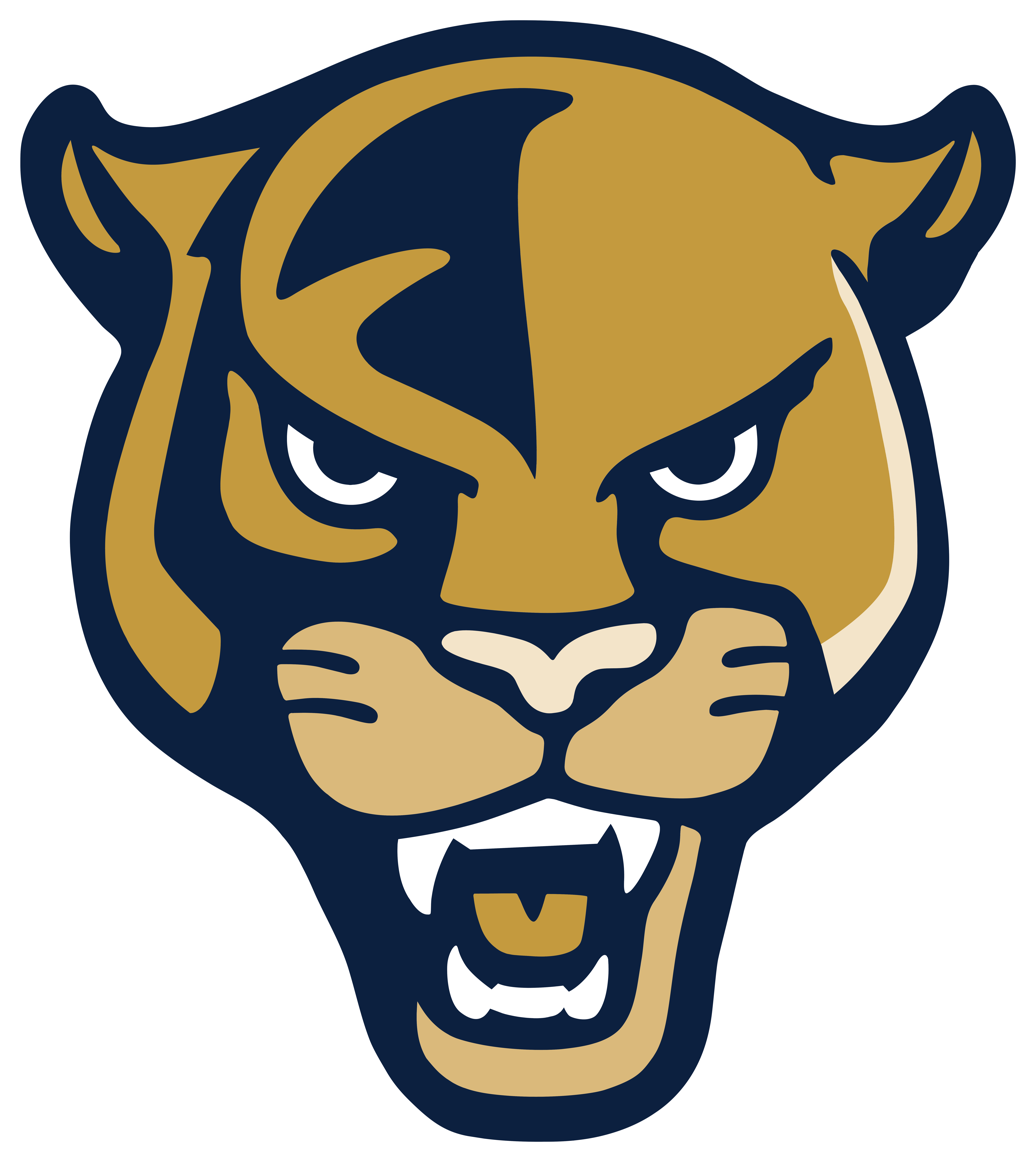
- University: Florida International University
- Head coach: Joey Cantens (1st season)
- Location: Westchester, Florida
- Arena: Ocean Bank Convocation Center (capacity: 5,000)
- Conference: Conference USA
- Nickname: Panthers
- Colors: Blue and gold
- All-time record: 474–700 (.404)

NCAA Division I tournament appearances
- 1995

Conference tournament champions
- TAAC: 1995

Conference regular-season champions
- TAAC: 1993

Uniforms
Home	Away	Alternate

The FIU Panthers men's basketball team represents Florida International University in Westchester, Florida. The school's team currently competes in Conference USA. They are led by head coach Joey Cantens and play their home games at the Ocean Bank Convocation Center.

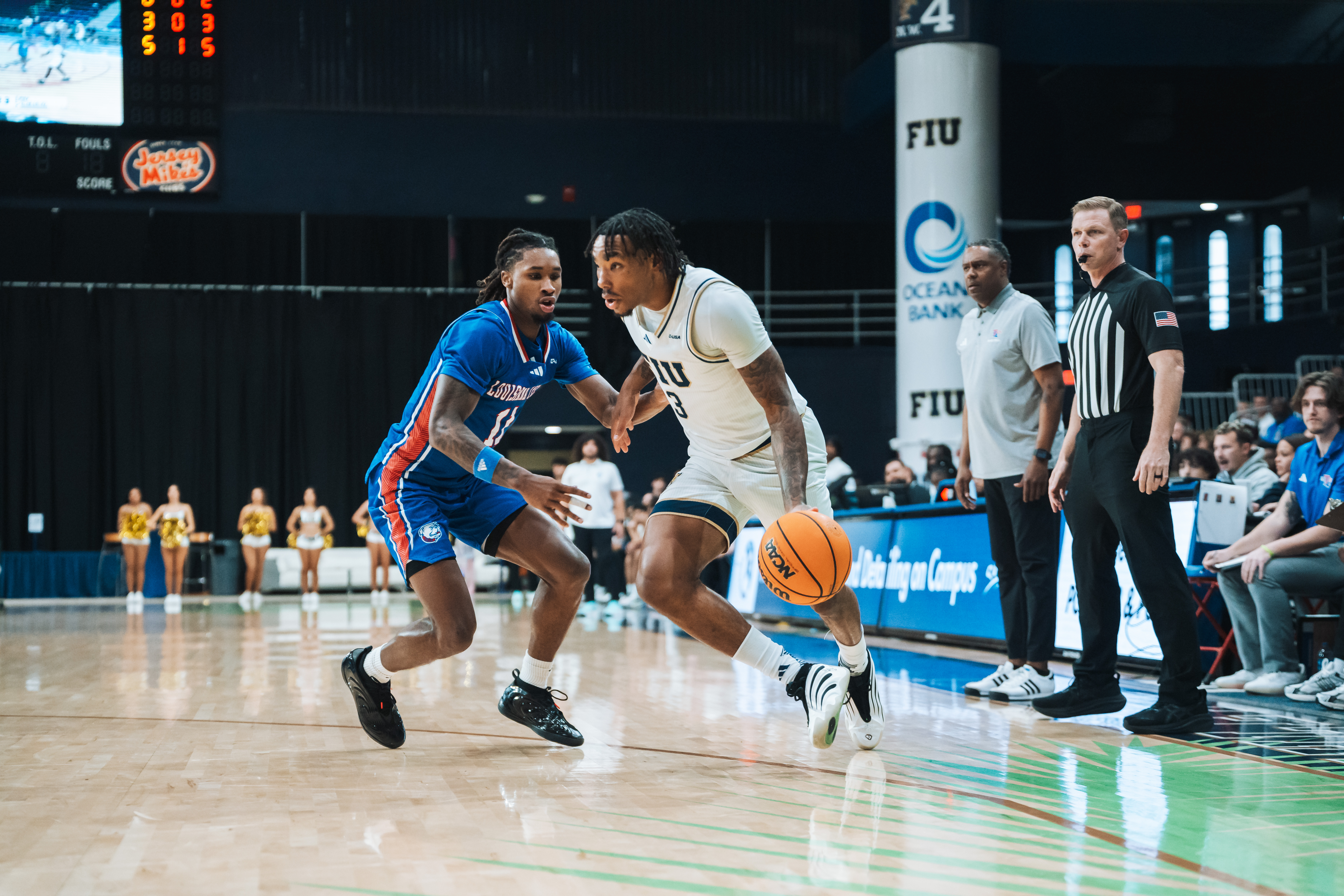
FIU playing against Louisiana Tech at home, 2026

== Isiah Thomas era ==
Isiah Thomas was the coach of FIU from 2009 to 2012 after an unsuccessful two-year stint with the New York Knicks of the NBA. His tenure started with provost Ronald Berkman introducing him as "Isiah Thompson" at an event. He was fired after the 2011–12 season, compiling a 26–65 record in three seasons at FIU.

== Richard Pitino era ==
On April 15, 2012, Richard Pitino left his position as the associate head coach at the University of Louisville to become the head coach at FIU. With only six players remaining from the previous season, and not all of them on scholarship, Pitino cobbled together a team and coached a high-pressure defense that finished eighth in the nation in steals. He was able to compile an 18–14 record (11-9 in the Sun Belt conference) in his only season as head coach. His FIU team set a record for the best conference record in school history. Additionally, FIU reached the Sun Belt tournament championship game as a four seed, before falling to Western Kentucky, 65–63.

On April 3, 2013, Richard Pitino was hired to become the next head coach at the University of Minnesota, replacing Tubby Smith.

== Anthony Evans era ==
On April 15, 2013, Anthony Evans left his position as head coach at Norfolk State University to become the head coach at FIU.

On April 2, 2018, FIU fired Evans after 5 seasons, in which the Panthers finished 65–94 with no postseason tournament appearances.

== Jeremy Ballard era ==
On April 20, 2018, VCU associate head coach Jeremy Ballard was hired by the Panthers for the head coaching job.

After a 20-win season in his first year and 19 wins during his second, FIU struggled under Ballard, never finishing higher than sixth in Conference USA or with more than eight wins during conference play, equaled in 2022-23 and 2025-26.

Nonetheless, Ballard became just the second coach in FIU history to surpass 100 career wins, doing so against Fort Lauderdale on November 18, 2025. He surpassed the FIU all-time wins record of 108 set by Rich Walker on February 4, 2026 in an 88-84 overtime victory at Middle Tennessee, the squad's first win in Murfreesboro since 2021.

Ballard racked up four more wins during the season before being dispatched by ninth-seeded Missouri State in the first round of the CUSA Tournament. It was announced that he would not return as FIU head coach on March 11, 2026, finishing his tenure with an overall record of 113-141 and 50-95 in conference play.

== Joey Cantens era ==
On March 20, 2026, Daytona State head coach Joey Cantens left his position with the Falcons and was named the tenth head coach in FIU history.

== NCAA Tournament appearances ==
FIU men's basketball team had its lone NCAA Tournament appearance in the 1995 tournament under then Head Coach Bob Weltlich, who had already announced his resignation following the season. FIU won the TAAC Basketball Tournament and in doing so earned an automatic bid for the NCAA tournament, and in doing so became the worst team to receive a bid in its history. FIU was seeded #16 and played the #1 seeded UCLA Bruins in the first round of the West Regional, which was played at the Taco Bell Arena in Boise. The Panthers lost the game to the Bruins by the score of 92–56, being the first tournament win in UCLA's successful run to the National Championship that year. Weltlich notably said during the post-game interview, "If anyone knows of any openings out there, my number is...".

== Media appearances ==
The "Sunblazers" men's basketball team was also featured in a second-season episode of Miami Vice entitled "The Fix".

== Postseason ==
=== NCAA tournament results ===
The Panthers have appeared in one NCAA tournament. Their record is 0–1.

Year	Seed	Round	Opponent	Result
1995	16	First round	(1) UCLA	L 56–92

=== CIT Results ===
The Panthers have appeared in the CollegeInsider.com Postseason Tournament (CIT) one time. Their record is 1-1.

Year	Round	Opponent	Result
2019	First round Second round	Texas State; Green Bay	W 87–81; L 68–98

== Year-by-year results ==
Season	Conference affiliation	Win–loss (overall)	Win–loss (overall)	Conference finish	Postseason
1981–82	D-II Independent	11–16	n/a	n/a	
1982–83	D-II Independent	15–12	n/a	n/a	
1983–84	D-II Independent	13–13	n/a	n/a	
1984–85	D-II Independent	19–8	n/a	n/a	
1985–86	D-II Independent	17–9	n/a	n/a	
1986–87	D-II Independent	7–18	n/a	n/a	
1987–88	D-I Independent	9–19	n/a	n/a	
1988–89	D-I Independent	10–18	n/a	n/a	
1989–90	D-I Independent	9–19	n/a	n/a	
1990–91	D-I Independent	6–22	n/a	n/a	
1991–92	TAAC	11–17	7–7	T–3rd	TAAC Tournament Quarterfinals
1992–93	TAAC	20–10	9–3	1st	TAAC Regular Season Champs
1993–94	TAAC	11–16	7–9	T–6th	TAAC Tournament Quarterfinals
1994–95	TAAC	11–19	4–12	T–9th	TAAC Tournament Champs; NCAA First Round
1995–96	TAAC	13–15	5–11	T–3rd East	TAAC Tournament Semifinals
1996–97	TAAC	16–13	12–4	2nd East	TAAC Tournament Finals
1997–98	TAAC	21–8	13–3	2nd East	TAAC Tournament Finals
1998–99	Sun Belt	13–16	7–7	T–3rd	Sun Belt Tournament Semifinals
1999–2000	Sun Belt	16–14	9–7	4th	Sun Belt Tournament First Round
2000–01	Sun Belt	8–21	5–11	5th East	Sun Belt Tournament Second Round
2001–02	Sun Belt	10–20	4–10	5th East	Sun Belt Tournament First Round
2002–03	Sun Belt	8–21	1–13	5th East	Sun Belt Tournament Second Round
2003–04	Sun Belt	5–22	0–13	5th East	
2004–05	Sun Belt	13–17	0–10	5th East	Sun Belt Tournament Semifinals
2005–06	Sun Belt	8–20	0–13	5th East	Sun Belt Tournament First Round
2006–07	Sun Belt	12–17	7–11	6th East	Sun Belt Tournament First Round
2007–08	Sun Belt	9–20	6–12	5th East	Sun Belt Tournament First Round
2008–09	Sun Belt	13–20	7–11	5th East	Sun Belt Tournament Quarterfinals
2009–10	Sun Belt	7–25	4–14	6th East	Sun Belt Tournament First Round
2010–11	Sun Belt	11–19	5–11	6th East	Sun Belt Tournament Quarterfinals
2011–12	Sun Belt	8–21	5–11	6th East	Sun Belt Tournament First Round
2012–13	Sun Belt	18–14	11–9	3rd East	Sun Belt Tournament Finals
2013–14	C-USA	15–16	7–9	T–8th	
2014–15	C-USA	16–17	8–10	T–7th	C-USA Tournament Quarterfinals
2015–16	C-USA	13–19	7–11	T–9th	C-USA Tournament Second Round
2016–17	C-USA	7–24	3–15	13th	
2017–18	C-USA	14–18	8–10	T–7th	C-USA Tournament First Round
2018–19	C-USA	20–14	10–8	7th	C-USA Tournament First Round; CIT Second Round
2019–20	C-USA	19–13	9-9	5th	C-USA Tournament Quarterfinals
2020–21	C-USA	9–17	2–15	14th (overall); 7th East	
2021–22	C-USA	15–17	5–13	11th (overall); 6th East	
2022–23	C-USA	14–18	8–12	T–6th	
2023–24	C-USA	11–22	5–11	9th	
2024–25	C-USA	10–23	3–15	10th	
2025–26	C-USA	15–17	8–12	8th	

== Records ==
=== Team Honors ===
NCAA tournament Appearances (1): 1995

Trans America Athletic Conference tournament champions (1): 1995
Trans America Athletic Conference regular season champions (1): 1992–93

== FIU basketball alumni in professional leagues ==
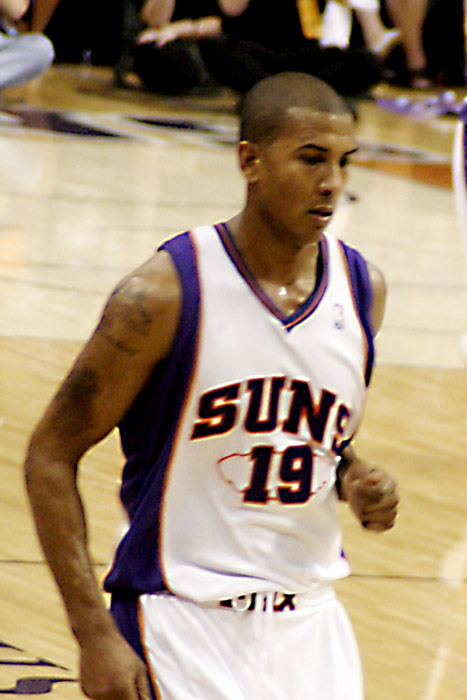
Raja Bell attended FIU for two seasons

FIU Panthers alumni to have gone on to the NBA and international professional basketball.

Name	Years at FIU	Team
Carlos Arroyo	1998–2001	Boston Celtics
Raja Bell	1999–2000	Utah Jazz
Clyde Corley	1982–1983	Dallas Mavericks

- Denver Jones (born 2000), who finished his career at Auburn, spent two years at FIU, being named All-Conference USA First Team in his second. He plays for Bnei Herzliya in the Israeli Basketball Premier League.
- Osasumwen Osaghae (born 1998), who spent 2016-20 at FIU and led the NCAA in blocks in 2019-20, is currently a free agent.
