= Hampton Pirates basketball statistical leaders =

The Hampton Pirates men's basketball statistical leaders are individual statistical leaders of the Hampton Pirates men's basketball program in various categories, including points, rebounds, assists, steals, and blocks. Within those areas, the lists identify single-game, single-season, and career leaders. The Pirates represent Hampton University in the NCAA's Big South Conference.

Hampton began competing in intercollegiate basketball in 1952. The NCAA did not officially record assists as a stat until the 1983–84 season, and blocks and steals until the 1985–86 season, but Hampton's record books includes players in these stats before these seasons. These lists are updated through the end of the 2020–21 season.

== Scoring ==
Career
Rank	Player	Points	Seasons
1	Jermaine Marrow	2,680	2016–17 2017–18 2018–19 2019–20
2	Rick Mahorn	2,418	1976–77 1977–78 1978–79 1979–80
3	Greg Hines	1,976	1979–80 1980–81 1981–82 1982–83
4	JaFonde Williams	1,800	1992–93 1993–94 1994–95 1995–96
5	Devin Green	1,757	2001–02 2002–03 2003–04 2004–05
6	Darryl Warwick	1,755	1977–78 1978–79 1979–80 1980–81
7	Tarvis Williams	1,754	1997–98 1998–99 1999–00 2000–01
8	Prentice Hill	1,684	1967–68 1968–69 1969–70 1970–71
9	Tony Washington	1,679	1979–80 1980–81 1981–82 1982–83
10	Darrion Pellum	1,607	2008–09 2009–10 2010–11 2011–12

Season
Rank	Player	Points	Season
1	Rick Mahorn	855	1979–80
2	Jermaine Marrow	854	2018–19
3	Benjamin Stanley	749	2019–20
4	Rick Mahorn	719	1977–78
5	Tarvis Williams	702	2000–01
6	Jermaine Marrow	693	2019–20
7	Rick Mahorn	685	1978–79
8	Tony Washington	671	1981–82
9	JaFonde Williams	669	1995–96
10	Jermaine Marrow	658	2017–18

Single game
Rank	Player	Points	Season	Opponent
1	Rick Mahorn	48	1979–80	St. Augustine's
2	JaFonde Williams	47	1994–95	Norfolk State
3	Keith Tolliver	46	1977–78	Virginia State
	Darryl Warwick	46	1980–81	Norfolk State
5	JaFonde Williams	43	1995–96	Maine
	Michael Eley	43	2025–26	Campbell
7	Henry Sherman	42	1975–76	Johnson C. Smith
	Prentice Hill	42	1969–70	St. Paul's
	Robert Kornegay	42	1969–70	Coppin State
10	Rick Mahorn	41	1979–80	Fayetteville State
	Rick Mahorn	41	1978–79	Winston-Salem State

== Rebounds ==
Career
Rank	Player	Rebounds	Seasons
1	Rick Mahorn	1,465	1976–77 1977–78 1978–79 1979–80
2	Greg Hines	1,254	1979–80 1980–81 1981–82 1982–83
3	Harold James	972	1967–68 1968–69 1969–70
4	Cedric Miller	916	1981–82 1982–83 1983–84 1984–85
5	Marvin Payne	912	1976–77 1977–78 1978–79
6	Robert Kornegay	905	1967–68 1968–69 1969–70
7	Keith Tolliver	768	1976–77 1977–78 1978–79
8	Isaac Jefferson	767	1999–00 2000–01 2001–02 2002–03
	Devin Green	767	2001–02 2002–03 2003–04 2004–05
10	David Saunders	747	1990–91 1991–92 1992–93 1993–94

Season
Rank	Player	Rebounds	Season
1	Rick Mahorn	490	1979–80
2	Wayne Britt	456	1973–74
3	Rick Mahorn	430	1978–79
4	Marvin Payne	420	1976–77
5	Harold James	401	1969–70
6	Greg Hines	392	1982–83
7	Rick Mahorn	377	1977–78
8	Cedric Miller	363	1984–85
9	Marvin Childs	351	1990–91
10	Greg Hines	346	1979–80

Single game
Rank	Player	Rebounds	Season	Opponent
1	Rick Mahorn	28	1978–79	W-S State
2	Marvin Payne	27	1977–78	District of Columbia
3	Rick Mahorn	24	1978–79	Norfolk State
	Rick Mahorn	24	1979–80	Norfolk State
5	Rick Mahorn	23	1979–80	Lincoln
	Rick Mahorn	23	1979–80	Norfolk State
	Quinton Chievous	23	2015–16	Winthrop
8	Marvin Payne	22	1978–79	St. Paul's
	Rick Mahorn	22	1979–80	St. Augustine's
	Keith Tolliver	22	1977–78	District of Columbia

== Assists ==
Career
Rank	Player	Assists	Seasons
1	Darryl Warwick	722	1977–78 1978–79 1979–80 1980–81
2	Jermaine Marrow	637	2016–17 2017–18 2018–19 2019–20
3	Charles Hankerson	551	1979–80 1980–81 1981–82 1982–83
4	Russell Dean	461	2019–20 2020–21 2021–22 2022–23
5	William Johnson	412	1982–83 1983–84 1984–85 1985–86
6	Kenneth Brown	410	1989–90 1990–91 1991–92
7	Deron Powers	393	2012–13 2013–14 2014–15
8	Isaac Jefferson	363	1999–00 2000–01 2001–02 2002–03
9	Tyrome Best	350	1973–74 1974–75 1975–76 1976–77
10	Tony Threatt	329	1974–75 1975–76 1976–77 1977–78

Season
Rank	Player	Assists	Season
1	Darryl Warwick	214	1979–80
2	Tyrome Best	210	1975–76
3	Darryl Warwick	198	1978–79
4	William Johnson	193	1984–85
5	Jermaine Marrow	189	2017–18
6	Jermaine Marrow	183	2019–20
7	Darryl Warwick	175	1980–81
8	Jermaine Marrow	171	2018–19
9	Kenneth Brown	167	1990–91
10	Raymond Lee	158	1986–87

Single game
Rank	Player	Assists	Season	Opponent
1	Tony Threatt	18	1976–77	Winston-Salem State
2	Marseilles Brown	15	1999–00	Howard
	Rich Taliaferro	15	1978–79	District of Columbia
4	Jermaine Marrow	14	2019–20	Charleston Southern
	Russell Dean	14	2020–21	Gardner-Webb
6	Marseilles Brown	13	1999–00	Norfolk State
	Tyrome Best	13	1975–76	Virginia State
	Reginald Johnson Jr.	13	2015–16	Morgan State
9	Brandon Tunnell	12	2010–11	UMES
	Tyrome Best	12	1975–76	Norfolk State
	Damany Smith	12	1996–97	Howard
	Darryl Warwick	12	1978–79	Lincoln
	Michael James	12	1992–93	Johnson C. Smith
	Damany Smith	12	1998–99	Howard
	Deron Powers	12	2012–13	Delaware State

== Steals ==
Career
Rank	Player	Steals	Seasons
1	Tommy Adams	216	1998–99 1999–00 2000–01 2001–02
2	Devin Green	168	2001–02 2002–03 2003–04 2004–05
3	JaFonde Williams	162	1992–93 1993–94 1994–95 1995–96
4	Vincent Simpson	158	2006–07 2007–08 2008–09 2009–10
5	Jermaine Gholson	155	1993–94 1994–95 1995–96
6	Jermaine Marrow	154	2016–17 2017–18 2018–19 2019–20
7	Isaac Jefferson	152	1999–00 2000–01 2001–02 2002–03
8	Ke’Ron Brown	151	2012–13 2013–14 2014–15
9	Darrion Pellum	146	2008–09 2009–10 2010–11 2011–12
10	Jeff Granger	142	2002–03 2003–04 2004–05 2005–06
	William Johnson	142	1982–83 1983–84 1984–85 1985–86
	Rashad West	142	2004–05 2005–06 2006–07 2007–08

Season
Rank	Player	Steals	Season
1	Jermaine Gholson	85	1994–95
2	William Johnson	66	1984–85
3	Kalin Fisher	65	2018–19
4	Tommy Adams	63	2001–02
5	Mike Tuitt	61	2011–12
6	Tommy Adams	59	1999–00
7	Raymond Lee	58	1986–87
	Rashad Smith	58	2006–07
9	Barry Hairston	57	2002–03
10	Jermaine Marrow	56	2018–19
	Stacy Clark	56	1988–89
	Devin Green	56	2004–05

Single game
Rank	Player	Steals	Season	Opponent
1	Tony Washington	9	1982–83	St. Paul's
2	Ke’Ron Brown	8	2012–13	Radford
3	Jermaine Gholson	7	1994–95	Fayetteville State
	Tony Washington	7	1982–83	Morgan State
	Deron Powers	7	2012–13	Howard
6	Kalin Fisher	6	2018–19	Charleston Southern
	Malique Trent-Street	6	2017–18	Delaware State
	Reginald Johnson Jr.	6	2014–15	Florida A&M
	Tony Washington	6	1982–83	Virginia Union
	Andre McCoy	6	1985–86	Johnson C. Smith
	Tony Washington	6	1982–83	Bowie State
	Weldon Parham	6	1990–91	Virginia State
	Damany Smith	6	1996–97	Morgan State
	Michael Smith	6	1985–86	Rutgers-Camden
	Jermaine Gholson	6	1994–95	Wilberforce
	Tommy Adams	6	1999–00	Norfolk State
	Michael James	6	1991–92	Livingstone
	Tommy Adams	6	2000–01	Norfolk State
	Raymond Lee	6	1986–87	Fayetteville State
	Demario Mattox	6	2006–07	Florida A&M
	Darrion Pellum	6	2011–12	Maryland E. Shore

== Blocks ==
Career
Rank	Player	Blocks	Seasons
1	Tarvis Williams	448	1997–98 1998–99 1999–00 2000–01
2	Marvin Childs	245	1989–90 1990–91 1991–92 1992–93
3	Cedric Miller	203	1981–82 1982–83 1983–84 1984–85
4	Danny Agbelese	184	2010–11 2011–12
5	Du’Vaughn Maxwell	169	2012–13 2013–14
6	Dajour Dickens	147	2020–21 2021–22
7	Bruce Brown	139	2002–03 2003–04 2004–05 2005–06
8	Jervon Pressley	114	2013–14 2014–15 2015–16
9	Michael Freeman	106	2006–07 2007–08 2008–09 2009–10
10	Keith Hunter	90	1988–89 1989–90 1990–91 1991–92

Season
Rank	Player	Blocks	Season
1	Tarvis Williams	147	2000–01
2	Tarvis Williams	135	1998–99
3	Marvin Childs	110	1990–91
4	Danny Agbelese	101	2010–11
5	Cedric Miller	95	1984–85
6	Du’Vaughn Maxwell	92	2013–14
7	Cedric Miller	91	1983–84
8	Tarvis Williams	87	1999–00
9	Danny Agbelese	83	2011–12
10	Marvin Childs	82	1992–93

Single game
Rank	Player	Blocks	Season	Opponent
1	Tarvis Williams	12	2000–01	Delaware State
	Tarvis Williams	12	1998–99	North Carolina A&T
3	Marvin Childs	11	1989–90	Elizabeth City State
4	Tarvis Williams	10	1998–99	Maine
5	Tarvis Williams	9	1997–98	UMES
	Danny Agbelese	9	2011–12	Utah Valley
7	Tarvis Williams	8	2000–01	Delaware State
	Tarvis Williams	8	2000–01	Georgetown
	Tarvis Williams	8	1998–99	Florida A&M
	Tarvis Williams	8	1998–99	Florida A&M
	Tarvis Williams	8	1998–99	Coppin State
	Danny Agbelese	8	2011–12	Savannah State
