= 2000–01 Hampton Pirates basketball team =

American college basketball season

2000–01 Hampton Pirates basketball
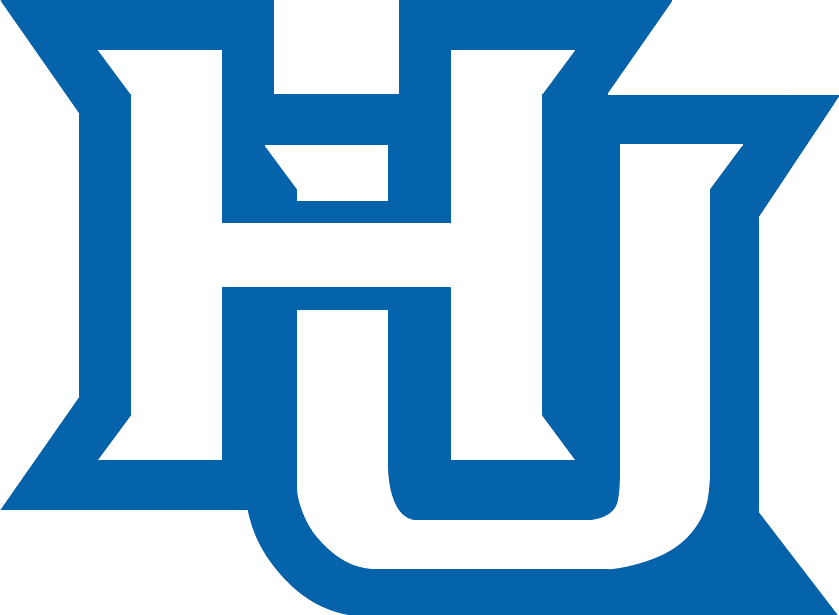

MEAC regular season co-champions and tournament champions

NCAA tournament, second round
- Conference: Mid-Eastern Athletic Conference
- Record: 25–7 (14–4 MEAC)
- Head coach: Steve Merfeld (4th season)
- Home arena: Hampton Convocation Center

2000–01 MEAC men's basketball standings
	Conf.				Overall
Team	W		L	PCT	W		L	PCT
Hampton †	14	–	4	.778	25	–	7	.781
South Carolina State	14	–	4	.778	19	–	13	.594
Delaware State	11	–	7	.611	13	–	15	.464
Norfolk State	11	–	7	.611	12	–	17	.414
Coppin State	11	–	8	.579	13	–	15	.464
Maryland Eastern Shore	10	–	8	.556	12	–	16	.429
North Carolina A&T	8	–	10	.444	13	–	17	.433
Howard	8	–	10	.444	10	–	18	.357
Bethune–Cookman	5	–	13	.278	10	–	19	.345
Florida A&M	4	–	14	.222	6	–	22	.214
Morgan State	4	–	15	.211	6	–	23	.207
† 2001 MEAC tournament winner Rankings from AP Poll

The 2000–01 Hampton Pirates men's basketball team represented Hampton University during the 2000–01 NCAA Division I men's basketball season. The Pirates were members of the Mid-Eastern Athletic Conference and were coached by Steve Merfeld, his fourth year as head coach. The Pirates played home games at the Hampton Convocation Center.

Hampton finished the season with a 25–7 record and an 14–4 MEAC record. The season was highlighted by the Pirates winning their first ever game in the NCAA Division I men's basketball tournament, becoming the fourth 15-seed to beat a 2-seed in the tournament. Hampton defeated Iowa State before losing to Georgetown in the second round.

== Roster ==
2000–01 Hampton Pirates men's basketball team
Players
Coaches

Pos.	#	Name	Height	Weight	Year	Hometown
G	1	Marseilles Brown	5 ft 10 in (1.78 m)	160 lb (73 kg)	Sr	Richmond	Hampton, VA
G	2	Lasean Howard	6 ft 6 in (1.98 m)	175 lb (79 kg)	Sr	Syracuse	Toledo, OH
G	4	Isaac Jefferson	6 ft 5 in (1.96 m)	205 lb (93 kg)	So	?	West Columbus, OH
F	5	Cleveland Davis	6 ft 7 in (2.01 m)	227 lb (103 kg)	So	?	Fayetteville, NC
G	10	Tommy Adams	6 ft 3 in (1.91 m)	180 lb (82 kg)	Jr	C. D. Hylton	Woodbridge, VA
G	32	Arthimus Howard	—	180 lb (82 kg)	So	?	Tuskegee, AL
F	34	David Johnson	6 ft 8 in (2.03 m)	235 lb (107 kg)	Fr	?	Norfolk, VA
F/C	40	Tarvis Williams	6 ft 7 in (2.01 m)	200 lb (91 kg)	Sr	White Oak HS	Maysville, NC

Head coach

- Steve Merfeld

Assistant coach(es)

Legend

- (C) Team captain
- (S) Suspended
- (I) Ineligible
- (W) Walk-on
- Injured
- Current redshirt

Roster

== Schedule and results ==
Date time, TV	Rank^{#}	Opponent^{#}	Result	Record	Site (attendance) city, state
Regular season
November 18, 2000*		at Western Michigan	W 87–81	1–0	University Arena; Kalamazoo, MI
November 20, 2000*		at Eastern Michigan	W 73–71	2–0	Convocation Center; Ypsilanti, MI
November 22, 2000*		at Green Bay	W 92–70	3–0	Brown County Arena; Green Bay, WI
November 26, 2000*		at Radford	L 70–74	3–1	Dedmon Center; Radford, VA
November 29, 2000		at Norfolk State	L 70–87	3–2 (0–1)	Echols Hall; Norfolk, VA
December 4, 2000		Howard	W 82–71	4–2 (1–1)	Hampton Convocation Center; Hampton, VA
December 6, 2000		Maryland Eastern Shore	W 91–72	5–2 (2–1)	Hampton Convocation Center; Hampton, VA
December 18, 2000*		at Wichita State	W 68–51	6–2	Charles Koch Arena; Wichita, KS
December 20, 2000*		at Kansas State	L 71–86	6–3	Bramlage Coliseum; Manhattan, KS
December 29, 2000*		Chicago State	W 83–68	7–3	Hampton Convocation Center; Hampton, VA
January 6, 2001		at Morgan State	W 72–67	8–3 (3–1)	Talmadge L. Hill Field House; Baltimore, MD
January 8, 2001		at Coppin State	W 61–60	9–3 (4–1)	Coppin Center; Baltimore, MD
January 13, 2001		Delaware State	W 79–54	10–3 (5–1)	Hampton Convocation Center; Hampton, VA
January 15, 2001*		William & Mary	W 71–63	11–3	Hampton Convocation Center; Hampton, VA
January 20, 2001		at North Carolina A&T	L 80–82	11–4 (5–2)	Corbett Sports Center; Greensboro, NC
January 22, 2001		at South Carolina State	L 68–72	11–5 (5–3)	SHM Memorial Center; Orangeburg, SC
January 27, 2001		Bethune–Cookman	W 87–85	12–5 (6–3)	Hampton Convocation Center; Hampton, VA
January 29, 2001		at Florida A&M	W 77–64	13–5 (7–3)	Jake Gaither Gymnasium; Tallahassee, FL
January 31, 2001*		at UCF	W 78–74 ^{OT}	14–5	UCF Arena; Orlando, FL
February 3, 2001		at Maryland Eastern Shore	W 91–67	15–5 (8–3)	J. Millard Tawes Gymnasium; Princess Anne, MD
February 5, 2001		at Howard	W 89–69	16–5 (9–3)	Burr Gymnasium; Washington, D.C.
February 10, 2001		Morgan State	W 78–67	17–5 (10–3)	Hampton Convocation Center; Hampton, VA
February 12, 2001		Coppin State	W 70–67	18–5 (11–3)	Hampton Convocation Center; Hampton, VA
February 17, 2001		at Delaware State	W 89–69	19–5 (12–3)	Memorial Hall; Dover, DE
February 24, 2001		South Carolina State	W 87–75	20–5 (13–3)	Hampton Convocation Center; Hampton, VA
February 26, 2001		North Carolina A&T	W 86–75	21–5 (14–3)	Hampton Convocation Center; Hampton, VA
March 3, 2001		Norfolk State	L 82–94 ^{OT}	21–6 (14–4)	Hampton Convocation Center; Hampton, VA
MEAC tournament
March 7, 2001*	(1)	vs. (11) Morgan State; Quarterfinals	W 76–64	22–6	Arthur Ashe Athletic Center; Richmond, VA
March 9, 2001*	(1)	vs. (4) Norfolk State; Semifinals	W 94–67	23–6	Arthur Ashe Athletic Center; Richmond, VA
March 10, 2001*	(1)	vs. (2) South Carolina State; Championship Game	W 70–68	24–6	Arthur Ashe Athletic Center; Richmond, VA
NCAA tournament
March 15, 2001*; 10:07 pm, CBS	(15 W)	vs. (2 W) No. 10 Iowa State; First Round	W 58–57	25–6	BSU Pavilion; Boise, ID
March 17, 2001*; CBS	(15 W)	vs. (10 W) Georgetown; Second Round	L 57–76	25–7	BSU Pavilion (11,669); Boise, ID
*Non-conference game. ^{#}Rankings from AP poll. (#) Tournament seedings in parentheses. W=West. All times are in Eastern Time.

== Awards and honors ==
- Tarvis Williams – MEAC Player of the Year
