= 2001–02 Hampton Pirates basketball team =

American college basketball season

2001–02 Hampton Pirates basketball
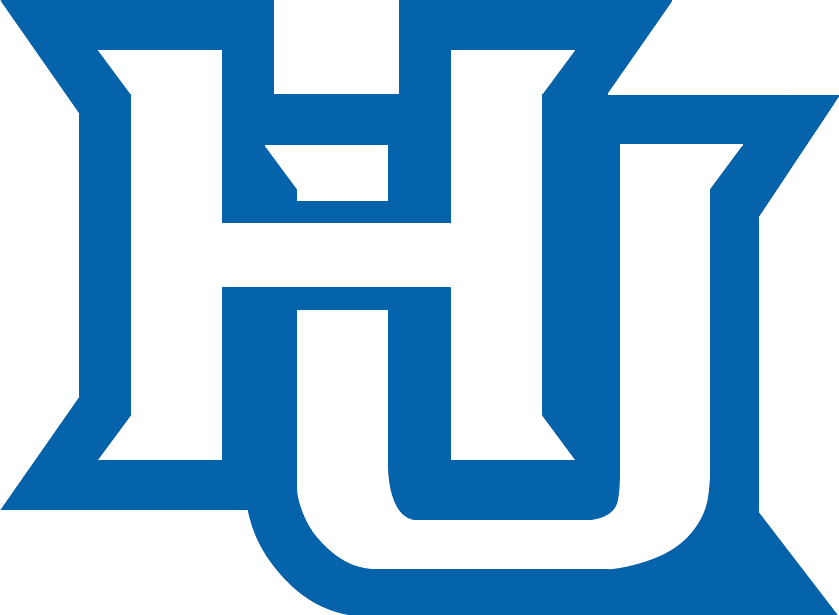

MEAC regular season and tournament champions

NCAA tournament, first round
- Conference: Mid-Eastern Athletic Conference
- Record: 26–7 (17–1 MEAC)
- Head coach: Steve Merfeld (5th season)
- Home arena: Hampton Convocation Center

2001–02 MEAC men's basketball standings
	Conf.				Overall
Team	W		L	PCT	W		L	PCT
Hampton †	17	–	1	.944	26	–	7	.788
Delaware State	12	–	6	.667	16	–	13	.552
Howard	11	–	7	.611	18	–	13	.581
South Carolina State	11	–	7	.611	15	–	16	.484
North Carolina A&T	10	–	8	.556	11	–	17	.393
Norfolk State	9	–	9	.500	10	–	19	.345
Florida A&M	9	–	9	.500	9	–	19	.321
Bethune–Cookman	8	–	10	.444	12	–	17	.414
Maryland Eastern Shore	7	–	11	.389	11	–	18	.379
Coppin State	3	–	15	.167	6	–	25	.194
Morgan State	2	–	16	.111	3	–	25	.107
† 2002 MEAC tournament winner Rankings from AP Poll

The 2001–02 Hampton Pirates men's basketball team represented Hampton University during the 2001–02 NCAA Division I men's basketball season. The Pirates were members of the Mid-Eastern Athletic Conference and were coached by Steve Merfeld, his fifth and final year as head coach. The Pirates played home games at the Hampton Convocation Center.

Hampton finished the season with 26–7 record and an 17–1 MEAC record. The Pirates rolled through the MEAC regular season, finishing five games ahead of second place Delaware State. The team won the MEAC tournament for the second straight season to earn the conference's automatic bid to the NCAA tournament. Playing as No. 15 seed in the East region, Hampton was beaten by No. 2 seed Connecticut, 78–67, in the opening round.

== Previous season ==
Hampton finished the season with a 25–7 record and an 14–4 MEAC record. The season was highlighted by the Pirates winning their first ever game in the NCAA Division I men's basketball tournament, becoming the fourth 15-seed to beat a 2-seed in the tournament. Hampton defeated Iowa State before losing to Georgetown in the second round.

== Roster ==
2001–02 Hampton Pirates men's basketball team
Players
Coaches

Pos.	#	Name	Height	Weight	Year	Previous school	Hometown
G	4	Isaac Jefferson	6 ft 5 in (1.96 m)	205 lb (93 kg)	Jr	?	West Columbus, OH
F	5	Cleveland Davis	6 ft 7 in (2.01 m)	227 lb (103 kg)	Jr	?	Fayetteville, NC
G	10	Tommy Adams	6 ft 3 in (1.91 m)	180 lb (82 kg)	Sr	C. D. Hylton	Woodbridge, VA
G	21	Devin Green	6 ft 7 in (2.01 m)	210 lb (95 kg)	Fr	Beechcroft	Columbus, OH
G	32	Arthimus Howard	—	180 lb (82 kg)	Jr	?	Tuskegee, AL
F	34	David Johnson	6 ft 8 in (2.03 m)	235 lb (107 kg)	So	?	Norfolk, VA

Head coach

- Steve Merfeld

Assistant coach(es)

Legend

- (C) Team captain
- (S) Suspended
- (I) Ineligible
- (W) Walk-on
- Injured
- Current redshirt

Roster

== Schedule and results ==
Date time, TV	Rank^{#}	Opponent^{#}	Result	Record	Site (attendance) city, state
Regular season
Nov 16, 2001*		at No. 19 North Carolina	W 77–69	1–0	Dean Smith Center (17,320); Chapel Hill, North Carolina
Nov 19, 2001*		Central Florida	W 73–72	2–0	Hampton Convocation Center; Hampton, Virginia
Nov 23, 2001*		vs. Vanderbilt	L 85–100	2–1	Neal S. Blaisdell Center; Honolulu, Hawaii
Nov 24, 2001*		vs. Akron	W 67–59	3–1	Neal S. Blaisdell Center; Honolulu, Hawaii
Nov 25, 2001*		vs. Hawaii Pacific	W 83–76	4–1	Neal S. Blaisdell Center; Honolulu, Hawaii
Dec 1, 2001		at Morgan State	W 78–70	5–1 (1–0)	Talmadge L. Hill Field House; Baltimore, Maryland
Dec 3, 2001		at Coppin State	W 81–69	6–1 (2–0)	Coppin Center; Baltimore, Maryland
Dec 8, 2001		Norfolk State	W 85–57	7–1 (3–0)	Hampton Convocation Center; Hampton, Virginia
Dec 18, 2001*		at Old Dominion	W 84–77	8–1	ODU Fieldhouse; Norfolk, Virginia
Dec 21, 2001*		at Bradley	L 84–87 ^{2OT}	8–2	Carver Arena; Peoria, Illinois
Dec 23, 2001*		at Western Illinois	L 74–77	8–3	Western Hall; Macomb, Illinois
Dec 29, 2001*		at Montana State; Bobcat Classic	L 66–80	8–4	Worthington Arena; Bozeman, Montana
Dec 30, 2001*		vs. Troy State; Bobcat Classic	L 91–100 ^{OT}	8–5	Worthington Arena; Havre, Montana
Jan 5, 2002		Maryland-Eastern Shore	W 86–71	9–5 (4–0)	Hampton Convocation Center; Hampton, Virginia
Jan 12, 2002		at South Carolina State	W 81–75	10–5 (5–0)	SHM Memorial Center; Orangeburg, South Carolina
Jan 14, 2002		at North Carolina A&T	W 82–68	11–5 (6–0)	Corbett Sports Center; Greensboro, North Carolina
Jan 19, 2002		Delaware State	W 58–55	12–5 (7–0)	Hampton Convocation Center; Hampton, Virginia
Jan 21, 2002		Howard	W 79–58	13–5 (8–0)	Hampton Convocation Center; Hampton, Virginia
Jan 25, 2002		at Bethune-Cookman	W 85–69	14–5 (9–0)	Moore Gymnasium; Daytona Beach, Florida
Jan 28, 2002		Florida A&M	W 97–65	15–5 (10–0)	Hampton Convocation Center; Hampton, Virginia
Feb 2, 2002		Morgan State	W 89–74	16–5 (11–0)	Hampton Convocation Center; Hampton, Virginia
Feb 4, 2002		Coppin State	W 78–51	17–5 (12–0)	Hampton Convocation Center; Hampton, Virginia
Feb 6, 2002*		at William & Mary	W 64–59	18–5	William & Mary Hall; Williamsburg, Virginia
Feb 9, 2002		at Maryland-Eastern Shore	W 81–63	19–5 (13–0)	Hytche Athletic Center; Princess Anne, Maryland
Feb 16, 2002		South Carolina State	W 87–73	20–5 (14–0)	Hampton Convocation Center; Hampton, Virginia
Feb 18, 2002		North Carolina A&T	W 72–61	21–5 (15–0)	Hampton Convocation Center; Hampton, Virginia
Feb 21, 2002		at Delaware State	W 63–58	22–5 (16–0)	Memorial Hall; Dover, Delaware
Feb 25, 2002		at Howard	L 81–82	22–6 (16–1)	Burr Gymnasium; Washington, D.C.
Mar 2, 2002		at Norfolk State	W 92–89 ^{OT}	23–6 (17–1)	Echols Memorial Hall; Norfolk, Virginia
MEAC tournament
Mar 6, 2002*		vs. Morgan State; Quarterfinals	W 93–70	24–6	Arthur Ashe Athletic Center; Richmond, Virginia
Mar 8, 2002*		vs. South Carolina State; Semifinals	W 80–70	25–6	Arthur Ashe Athletic Center; Richmond, Virginia
Mar 9, 2002*		vs. Howard; Championship game	W 80–62	26–6	Arthur Ashe Athletic Center; Richmond, Virginia
NCAA tournament
Mar 15, 2002*	(15 E)	vs. (2 E) No. 10 Connecticut; First round	L 67–78	26–7	Verizon Center; Washington, D.C.
*Non-conference game. ^{#}Rankings from AP poll. (#) Tournament seedings in parentheses. E=East. All times are in Eastern Time.

== Awards and honors ==
- Tommy Adams – MEAC Player of the Year
