= 2010–11 Bethune–Cookman Wildcats men's basketball team =

American college basketball season

2010–11 Bethune–Cookman Wildcats men's basketball

MEAC Regular Season champions

NIT, First round
- Conference: Mid-Eastern Athletic Conference
- Record: 21–13 (13–3 MEAC)
- Head coach: Clifford Reed (10th season)
- Home arena: Moore Gymnasium; Ocean Center

2010–11 MEAC men's basketball standings
	Conf.				Overall
Team	W		L	PCT	W		L	PCT
Bethune–Cookman	13	–	3	.813	21	–	13	.618
Hampton †	11	–	5	.688	24	–	9	.727
Coppin State	11	–	5	.688	16	–	14	.533
Morgan State	10	–	6	.625	17	–	14	.548
North Carolina A&T	9	–	7	.563	15	–	17	.469
Norfolk State	8	–	8	.500	12	–	20	.375
Florida A&M	7	–	9	.438	12	–	20	.375
South Carolina State	5	–	11	.313	10	–	22	.313
Delaware State	5	–	11	.313	9	–	21	.300
Maryland Eastern Shore	5	–	11	.313	9	–	22	.290
Howard	4	–	12	.250	6	–	24	.200
† 2011 MEAC tournament winner As of March 19, 2011; Rankings from AP Poll

The 2010–11 Bethune–Cookman Wildcats men's basketball team represented Bethune–Cookman University in the 2010–11 NCAA Division I men's basketball season. The Wildcats, led by head coach Clifford Reed, played their home games at Moore Gymnasium and the Ocean Center, both in Daytona Beach, Florida, as members of the Mid-Eastern Athletic Conference. The Wildcats won the MEAC regular-season title, their first since joining Division I in 1980. The Wildcats were the number one seed in the MEAC tournament, but were upset in the semifinals by Morgan State.

Bethune–Cookman failed to qualify for the NCAA tournament, but received an automatic bid to the 2011 NIT as the regular-season champions of the MEAC. The Wildcats were eliminated in the first round of the NIT by Virginia Tech, 79–54.

== Roster ==
2010–11 Bethune–Cookman Wildcats men's basketball team
Players
Coaches

Pos.	#	Name	Height	Weight	Year	Hometown
G	2	Aric Miller	6 ft 3 in (1.91 m)	185 lb (84 kg)	So	Stone Mountain, Georgia
C	5	Albert Abrahams	6 ft 9 in (2.06 m)	320 lb (145 kg)	Sr	Miami, Florida
G	10	Stanley Elliott	6 ft 3 in (1.91 m)	160 lb (73 kg)	Jr	Newark, New Jersey
F	11	Javoris Bryant	6 ft 6 in (1.98 m)	200 lb (91 kg)	So	Atlanta, Georgia
G	12	Mikel Trapp	6 ft 2 in (1.88 m)	195 lb (88 kg)	Fr	Blair, South Carolina
G	21	Kevin Dukes	5 ft 9 in (1.75 m)	155 lb (70 kg)	So	Lithonia, Georgia
G	22	Dion Hudson	5 ft 10 in (1.78 m)	185 lb (84 kg)	Fr	Ontario, California
F	23	Garrius Holloman	6 ft 6 in (1.98 m)	210 lb (95 kg)	Jr	Wichita, Kansas
G	24	C. J. Reed	6 ft 3 in (1.91 m)	200 lb (91 kg)	Jr	Daytona Beach, Florida
F	32	Alex Starling	6 ft 6 in (1.98 m)	205 lb (93 kg)	Sr	Miami, Florida
F	33	Raymoan McAfee	6 ft 7 in (2.01 m)	195 lb (88 kg)	Fr	Detroit, Michigan

Head coach

- Clifford Reed (Bethune–Cookman)

Assistant coach(es)

Legend

- (C) Team captain
- (S) Suspended
- (I) Ineligible
- (W) Walk-on
- Injured
- Current redshirt

Roster
Last update: January 18, 2023

== Schedule and results ==
Date time, TV	Rank^{#}	Opponent^{#}	Result	Record	Site city, state
Regular season
November 13, 2010*; 7:00 pm		Edward Waters	W 85–49	1–0	Moore Gymnasium; Daytona Beach, FL
November 16, 2010*; 7:00 pm		Stetson	W 78–66	2–0	Moore Gymnasium; Daytona Beach, FL
November 21, 2010*; 4:00 pm		at Santa Clara; Las Vegas Invitational	L 61–75	2–1	Leavey Center; Santa Clara, CA
November 23, 2010*; 6:30 pm		at Arizona; Las Vegas Invitational	L 45–78	2–2	McKale Center; Tucson, AZ
November 26, 2010*; 2:30 pm		vs. Texas A&M–Corpus Christi; Las Vegas Invitational	L 65–69	2–3	Orleans Arena; Las Vegas, NV
November 27, 2010*; 2:30 pm		vs. Northern Colorado; Las Vegas Invitational	L 45–69	2–4	Orleans Arena; Las Vegas, NV
December 1, 2010*; 7:00 pm		Florida Christian	W 74–49	3–4	Moore Gymnasium; Daytona Beach, FL
December 4, 2010; 6:00 pm		at Florida A&M	W 62–55	4–4 (1–0)	Al Lawson Center; Tallahassee, FL
December 11, 2010*; 5:00 pm		at UCF	L 59–76	4–5	UCF Arena; Orlando, FL
December 13, 2010*; 7:00 pm		Webber International	W 69–58	5–5	Moore Gymnasium; Daytona Beach, FL
December 15, 2010*; 7:00 pm		at No. 9 Baylor	L 39–83	5–6	Ferrell Center; Waco, TX
December 18, 2010*; 2:00 pm		at Akron	L 66–77 ^{OT}	5–7	James A. Rhodes Arena; Akron, OH
December 30, 2010*; 7:30 pm		at Jacksonville	L 60–67	5–8	Jacksonville Veterans Memorial Arena; Jacksonville, FL
January 2, 2011*; 7:00 pm		Carver Bible	W 87–66	6–8	Moore Gymnasium; Daytona Beach, FL
January 8, 2011; 6:00 pm		at Norfolk State	W 85–83 ^{OT}	7–8 (2–0)	Joseph G. Echols Memorial Hall; Norfolk, VA
January 10, 2011; 7:00 pm		at North Carolina A&T	W 72–69	8–8 (3–0)	Corbett Sports Center; Greensboro, NC
January 15, 2011; 7:00 pm		at Delaware State	W 61–60	9–8 (4–0)	Memorial Hall; Dover, DE
January 17, 2011; 4:00 pm		at Maryland Eastern Shore	W 71–64	10–8 (5–0)	Hytche Athletic Center; Princess Anne, MD
January 22, 2011; 4:00 pm		Hampton	L 56–68	10–9 (5–1)	Moore Gymnasium; Daytona Beach, FL
January 24, 2011; 7:30 pm		Howard	W 56–49	11–9 (6–1)	Ocean Center; Daytona Beach, FL
January 29, 2011; 4:30 pm		at South Carolina State	W 61–60	12–9 (7–1)	SHM Memorial Center; Orangeburg, SC
January 31, 2011*; 7:30 pm		at North Carolina Central	W 67–64	13–9	McDougald–McLendon Arena; Durham, NC
February 5, 2011; 4:00 pm		Coppin State	L 79–90 ^{OT}	13–10 (7–2)	Moore Gymnasium; Daytona Beach, FL
February 7, 2011; 7:30 pm		Morgan State	L 57–65	13–11 (7–3)	Ocean Center; Daytona Beach, FL
February 12, 2011; 4:00 pm		Delaware State	W 61–48	14–11 (8–3)	Ocean Center; Daytona Beach, FL
February 14, 2011; 6:30 pm		Maryland Eastern Shore	W 86–50	15–11 (9–3)	Moore Gymnasium; Daytona Beach, FL
February 19, 2011; 6:00 pm		at Hampton	W 78–76 ^{2OT}	16–11 (10–3)	Hampton Convocation Center; Hampton, VA
February 21, 2011; 8:00 pm		at Howard	W 66–64	17–11 (11–3)	Burr Gymnasium; Washington, D.C.
February 26, 2011; 4:00 pm		South Carolina State	W 76–72	18–11 (12–3)	Ocean Center; Daytona Beach, FL
February 28, 2011*; 7:30 pm		North Carolina Central	W 73–60	19–11	Ocean Center; Daytona Beach, FL
March 3, 2011; 7:30 pm		Florida A&M	W 73–71	20–11 (13–3)	Ocean Center; Daytona Beach, FL
MEAC tournament
March 9, 2011; 7:00 pm	(1)	vs. (9) South Carolina State; MEAC Quarterfinals	W 66–50	21–11	LJVM Coliseum; Winston-Salem, NC
March 11, 2011; 6:00 pm	(1)	vs. (4) Morgan State; MEAC Semifinals	L 48–61	21–12	LJVM Coliseum; Winston-Salem, NC
NIT
March 16, 2011; 8:00 pm	(8 VT)	at (1 VT) Virginia Tech; NIT First Round	L 54–79	21–13	Cassell Coliseum; Blacksburg, VA
*Non-conference game. ^{#}Rankings from AP Poll. (#) Tournament seedings in parentheses. All times are in Eastern Time.
