= Steve Merfeld =

American basketball player and coach

Current position
- Title: Assistant to the head coach Director of player development
- Team: Creighton
- Conference: Big East

Biographical details
- Born: September 23, 1961 (age 65); Bloomington, Wisconsin, U.S.
- Education: Wisconsin–La Crosse

Coaching career (HC unless noted)
- 1986–1996: Bowling Green (asst.)
- 1996–1997: Hampton (asst.)
- 1997–2002: Hampton
- 2002–2007: Evansville
- 2007–2009: Bradley (asst.)
- 2010–present: Creighton (asst.)

Head coaching record
- Overall: 144–148 (.493)
- Tournaments: 1–2 (NCAA Division I)

Accomplishments and honors

Championships
- 2 MEAC tournament (2001, 2002); 2 MEAC regular season (2001, 2002)

Awards
- MEAC Coach of the Year (2002)

Stephen Mark Merfeld (born September 23, 1961) is an American college basketball coach. He currently is the associate head men's basketball coach at Creighton University and previously served as head coach at Hampton University and the University of Evansville.

== Career ==
After graduating from the University of Wisconsin–La Crosse, Merfeld began his coaching career with a ten-year stint as an assistant under Jim Larrañaga at Bowling Green State. He then joined the staff at Hampton, where he was promoted to head coach in 1997 after one season as an assistant coach. Merfeld coached the Hampton Pirates to back-to-back NCAA tournaments, including a first-round upset of second-seeded Iowa State in 2001. The shot of Hampton forward David Johnson lifting a jubilant Merfeld in the air in celebration after the Pirates' 2001 upset remains a memorable event in March Madness history.

After being named Mid-Major Coach of the Year by CollegeInsider.com in 2002, Merfeld departed Hampton to become the head coach at Evansville, a position he remained in until 2007.

In December 2009, he stepped down as an assistant coach at Bradley University.

Merfeld joined Greg McDermott's staff at Creighton prior to the 2010–11 season.

== Head coaching record ==
Record table
Season	Team	Overall	Conference	Standing	Postseason
Hampton Pirates (Mid-Eastern Athletic Conference) (1997–2002)
1997–98	Hampton	14–12	11–7	T–3rd	
1998–99	Hampton	8–19	8–10	8th	
1999–2000	Hampton	17–12	13–5	T–2nd	
2000–01	Hampton	25–7	14–4	T–1st	NCAA Division I Second Round
2001–02	Hampton	26–7	17–1	1st	NCAA Division I First Round
Hampton:		90–57 (.612)	63–27 (.700)		
Evansville Purple Aces (Missouri Valley Conference) (2002–2007)
2002–03	Evansville	12–16	8–10	T–5th	
2003–04	Evansville	7–22	5–13	T–8th	
2004–05	Evansville	11–17	5–13	T–9th	
2005–06	Evansville	10–19	5–13	T–7th	
2006–07	Evansville	14–17	6–12	T–7th	
Evansville:		54–91 (.372)	29–61 (.322)		
Total:		144–148 (.493)			
National champion Postseason invitational champion Conference regular season champion Conference regular season and conference tournament champion Division regular season champion Division regular season and conference tournament champion Conference tournament champion
