= Jermaine Marrow =

American basketball player (born 1997)

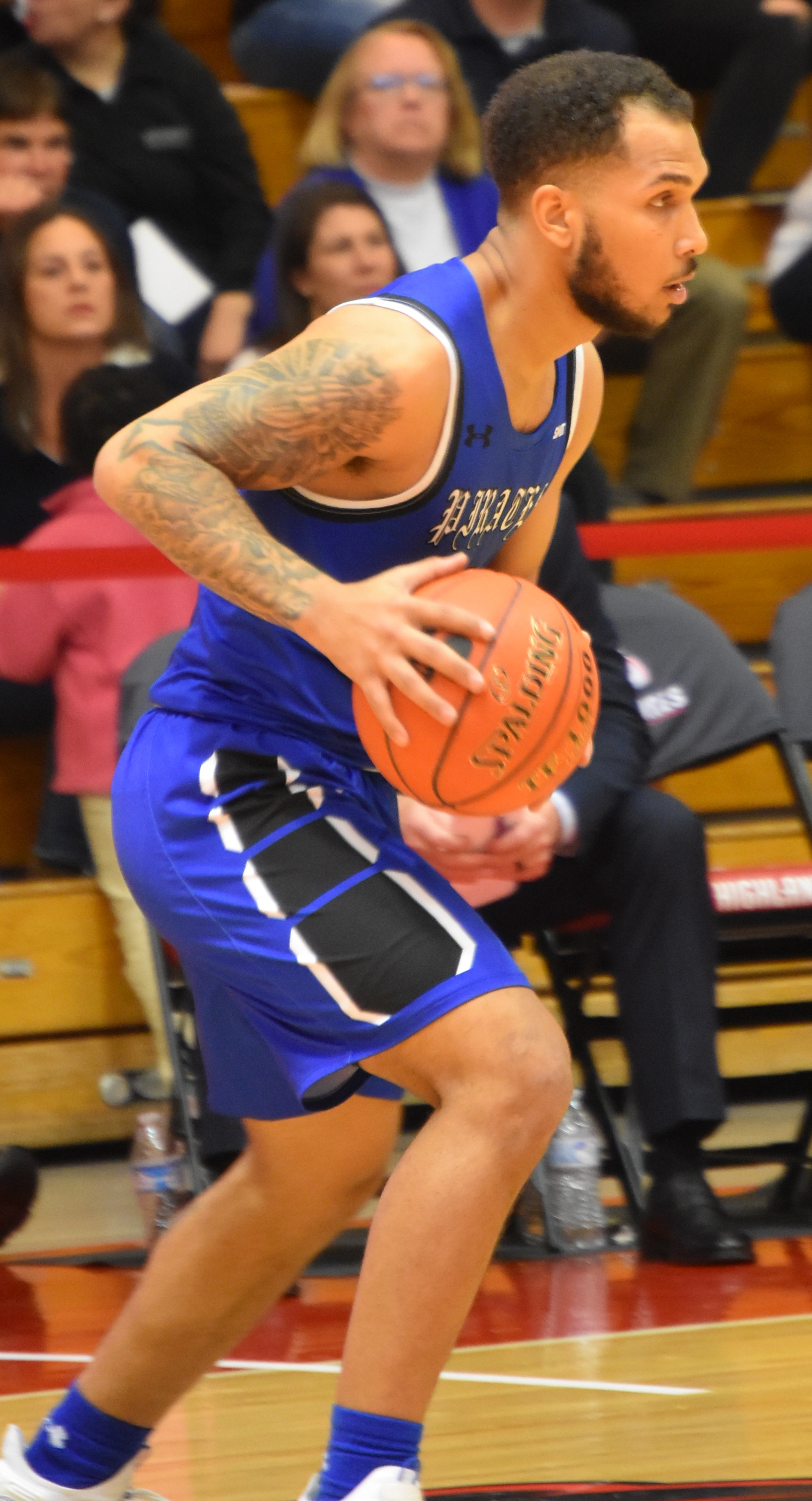
- Marrow with Hampton in March 2020

Free agent
- Position: Point guard

Personal information
- Born: August 7, 1997 (age 29)
- Listed height: 6 ft 0 in (1.83 m)
- Listed weight: 180 lb (82 kg)

Career information
- High school: Heritage (Newport News, Virginia); New Hope Christian Academy (Thomasville, North Carolina)
- College: Hampton (2016–2020)
- NBA draft: 2020: undrafted
- Playing career: 2021–present

Career history
- 2020: Mega Tbilisi
- 2021–2022: CB Menorca
- 2022–2023: Svendborg Rabbits
- 2023: Danang Dragons
- 2024: MBK Handlová
- 2024–2025: Naxçıvan BK

Career highlights
- 2× First-team All-Big South (2019, 2020); First-team All-MEAC (2018); Third-team All-MEAC (2017); MEAC All-Rookie Team (2017)

Jermaine Marrow (born August 7, 1997) is an American professional basketball player who last played for Naxçıvan BK of the Azerbaijan Basketball League. He played college basketball for the Hampton Pirates. He's currently playing in Denmark for the Svendborg Rabbits

== Early life and high school ==
In eighth grade Marrow caught the attention of Hampton coach Edward Joyner at a basketball camp, and Joyner offered him a scholarship on the spot. In his youth Marrow befriended Allen Iverson, whom he considers like a big brother and the greatest player of all time. Marrow played for Heritage High School in Newport News, Virginia as a freshman and sophomore, then transferred to New Hope Christian Academy in Thomasville, North Carolina before his junior season. He returned to Heritage as a senior and was their top scorer, averaging 31 points per game. In January 2016, Marrow committed to Hampton.

== College career ==
Marrow made an instant impact at Hampton as a freshman, averaging 15.6 points, 3.0 assists, and 3.2 rebounds per game but struggled with turnovers. He averaged 18.8 points, five rebounds and 5.4 assists per game as a sophomore, leading Hampton to the MEAC title game. He earned First Team All-MEAC honors. As a junior, Marrow averaged 24.4 points, 4.9 assists, and 4.1 rebounds per game, shooting 37 percent from behind the arc. He was named to the First Team All-Big South. Following the season, he declared for the 2019 NBA draft but later withdrew his name. In August 2019, he announced he was entering the transfer portal. However, Marrow later announced he was staying at Hampton. As a senior, Marrow surpassed Rick Mahorn as Hampton's all-time leading scorer during a win over UNC Asheville. Marrow scored 18 points as Hampton lost to Winthrop in the Big South championship game 75–68. He finished his career with 2,680 points, the 27th highest in Division I history. He averaged 24.8 points and 6.5 assists per game as a senior and became the first two-time national Player of the Year as selected by BoxToRow, covering historically black colleges in NCAA Division I. He was named to the First Team All-Big South and finished second to Carlik Jones in conference Player of the Year voting.

== Professional career ==
Marrow signed with Mega Tbilisi in the Georgian A League in 2020. He averaged 19.4 points, 4.2 rebounds, 4.7 assists, and 1.9 steals per game. On August 15, 2021, Marrow signed with CB Menorca of the LEB Plata.

On October 21, 2024, Marrow signed with Naxçıvan BK of the Azerbaijan Basketball League. On February 27, 2025, he parted ways with the team.
