= 2001 MEAC men's basketball tournament =

- Classification: Division I
- Season: 2000–01
- Teams: 11
- Site: Arthur Ashe Athletic Center; Richmond, Virginia
- Champions: Hampton (1st title)
- Winning coach: Steve Merfeld (1st title)
- MVP: Tarvis Williams (Hampton)

2000–01 MEAC men's basketball standings
	Conf.				Overall
Team	W		L	PCT	W		L	PCT
Hampton †	14	–	4	.778	25	–	7	.781
South Carolina State	14	–	4	.778	19	–	13	.594
Delaware State	11	–	7	.611	13	–	15	.464
Norfolk State	11	–	7	.611	12	–	17	.414
Coppin State	11	–	8	.579	13	–	15	.464
Maryland Eastern Shore	10	–	8	.556	12	–	16	.429
North Carolina A&T	8	–	10	.444	13	–	17	.433
Howard	8	–	10	.444	10	–	18	.357
Bethune–Cookman	5	–	13	.278	10	–	19	.345
Florida A&M	4	–	14	.222	6	–	22	.214
Morgan State	4	–	15	.211	6	–	23	.207
† 2001 MEAC tournament winner Rankings from AP Poll

The 2001 Mid-Eastern Athletic Conference men's basketball tournament took place on March 5–10, 2001 at the Arthur Ashe Athletic Center in Richmond, Virginia. Hampton defeated South Carolina State, 70–68 in the championship game, to win its first MEAC Tournament title. The Pirates earned an automatic bid to the 2001 NCAA tournament as #15 seed in the West region. In the round of 64, Hampton upset #2 seed Iowa State 58–57.

== Format ==
All eleven conference members participated, with the top 5 teams receiving a bye to the quarterfinal round. After seeds 6 through 11 completed games in the first round, teams were re-seeded. The lowest remaining seed was slotted against the top seed, next lowest remaining faced the #2 seed, and third lowest remaining seed squared off against the #3 seed.

== Bracket ==
First round Tuesday-Wednesday, March 5–6
8	Howard	62
9	Bethune–Cookman	63
6	Maryland Eastern Shore	64
11	Morgan State	76
7	North Carolina A&T	86
10	Florida A&M	70

Quarterfinals; Wednesday-Thursday, March 7–8
1	Hampton	76
11	Morgan State	64
4	Norfolk State	78
5	Coppin State	66
7	North Carolina A&T	83
3	Delaware State	73
2	South Carolina State	53
9	Bethune–Cookman	47

Semifinals; Friday, March 9
1	Hampton	94
4	Norfolk State	67
7	North Carolina A&T	53
2	South Carolina State	57

Final; Saturday, March 10
1	Hampton	70
2	South Carolina State	68
