= 2002 MEAC men's basketball tournament =

- Classification: Division I
- Season: 2001–02
- Teams: 11
- Site: Arthur Ashe Athletic Center; Richmond, Virginia
- Champions: Hampton (2nd title)
- Winning coach: Steve Merfeld (2nd title)
- MVP: Tommy Adams (Hampton)

2001–02 MEAC men's basketball standings
	Conf.				Overall
Team	W		L	PCT	W		L	PCT
Hampton †	17	–	1	.944	26	–	7	.788
Delaware State	12	–	6	.667	16	–	13	.552
Howard	11	–	7	.611	18	–	13	.581
South Carolina State	11	–	7	.611	15	–	16	.484
North Carolina A&T	10	–	8	.556	11	–	17	.393
Norfolk State	9	–	9	.500	10	–	19	.345
Florida A&M	9	–	9	.500	9	–	19	.321
Bethune–Cookman	8	–	10	.444	12	–	17	.414
Maryland Eastern Shore	7	–	11	.389	11	–	18	.379
Coppin State	3	–	15	.167	6	–	25	.194
Morgan State	2	–	16	.111	3	–	25	.107
† 2002 MEAC tournament winner Rankings from AP Poll

The 2002 Mid-Eastern Athletic Conference men's basketball tournament was held from March 4–9, 2002, at the Arthur Ashe Athletic Center in Richmond, Virginia. Hampton defeated Howard, 80–62 in the championship game to win its second consecutive MEAC Tournament title. The Pirates earned an automatic bid to the 2002 NCAA tournament as the No. 15 seed in the East region, where they lost to No. 2 seed Connecticut 78–67 in the round 64.

== Format ==
All eleven conference members participated, with the top five teams receiving a bye to the quarterfinals. After seeds 6 through 11 played in the first round, the remaining teams were re-seeded. The lowest remaining seed faced the top seed, the next-lowest seed played the #2 seed, and the third-lowest seed squared off against the #3 seed.

== Bracket ==
First round Tuesday-Wednesday, March 4–5
8	Bethune–Cookman	82
9	Maryland Eastern Shore	70
6	Florida A&M	91
11	Morgan State	94
7	Norfolk State	46
10	Coppin State	61

Quarterfinals; Wednesday-Thursday, March 6–7
1	Hampton	93
11	Morgan State	70
4	South Carolina State	63
5	North Carolina A&T	61
8	Bethune–Cookman	52
3	Howard	71
2	Delaware State	54
10	Coppin State	45

Semifinals; Friday, March 8
1	Hampton	80
4	South Carolina State	70
3	Howard	65
2	Delaware State	56

Final; Saturday, March 9
1	Hampton	80
3	Howard	62
