= C. J. Reed =

American basketball player (born 1990)

Personal information
- Born: May 14, 1990 (age 36) Daytona Beach, Florida, U.S.
- Listed height: 6 ft 3 in (1.91 m)
- Listed weight: 200 lb (91 kg)

Career information
- High school: Atlantic (Port Orange, Florida)
- College: Bethune-Cookman (2008–2011); Georgia Southern (2012–2013)
- NBA draft: 2013: undrafted
- Playing career: 2013–present
- Position: Point guard / shooting guard

Career highlights
- AP Honorable Mention All-American (2011); MEAC Player of the Year (2011); 2× First-team All-MEAC (2010, 2011); MEAC Freshman of the Year (2009)

Clifford Jervon "C. J." Reed (born May 14, 1990) is an American former college basketball player at Georgia Southern University. Reed transferred to Georgia Southern after an All-American career at Bethune-Cookman University.

Reed, a 6'3" guard from Daytona Beach, Florida is the son of former Bethune-Cookman coach Clifford Reed. In 2008, after a standout career at Atlantic High School, Reed went to play for his father at BCU. Reed was an immediate impact player for the Wildcats, averaging 15 points per game in 2008–09 and earning Mid-Eastern Athletic Conference freshman of the year honors.

Reed improved his scoring to 15.8 as a sophomore (earning first team all-MEAC honors), and 18.8 per game as a junior in a year where he was named MEAC Player of the Year. and was an AP honorable mention All-American selection. The Wildcats won the MEAC regular season championship.

After the season, Clifford was fired as coach at Bethune-Cookman for failing to aid authorities in a rape investigation where C. J. was the lone suspect (charges were later dropped). Reed decided to transfer from the program, eventually settling on Central Florida over North Florida and Tennessee State. However, after spending a year at UCF, Reed left when the school received NCAA sanctions barring them from postseason play, choosing to transfer to Georgia Southern. Because of the sanctions, Reed was not required to sit out another season with the transfer. The move reunited C. J. with his father Clifford, who had been hired as an assistant.

On February 16, 2013, Reed scored his 2000th career point against the College of Charleston.

After college, Reed played semi-pro basketball in Australia.
