= 2010–11 Hampton Pirates basketball team =

American college basketball season

2010–11 Hampton Pirates men's basketball
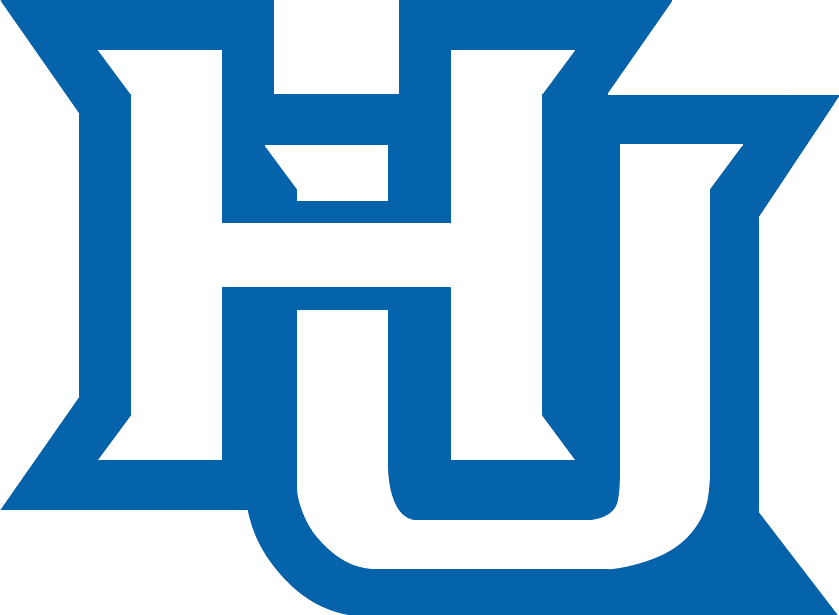

MEAC tournament champions

NCAA tournament, Round of 64
- Conference: Mid-Eastern Athletic Conference
- Record: 24–9 (11–5 MEAC)
- Head coach: Edward Joyner (2nd season)
- Assistant coaches: Darryl Sharp; Akeem Miskdeen; DeMarco Johnson
- Home arena: Hampton Convocation Center

2010–11 MEAC men's basketball standings
	Conf.				Overall
Team	W		L	PCT	W		L	PCT
Bethune–Cookman	13	–	3	.813	21	–	13	.618
Hampton †	11	–	5	.688	24	–	9	.727
Coppin State	11	–	5	.688	16	–	14	.533
Morgan State	10	–	6	.625	17	–	14	.548
North Carolina A&T	9	–	7	.563	15	–	17	.469
Norfolk State	8	–	8	.500	12	–	20	.375
Florida A&M	7	–	9	.438	12	–	20	.375
South Carolina State	5	–	11	.313	10	–	22	.313
Delaware State	5	–	11	.313	9	–	21	.300
Maryland Eastern Shore	5	–	11	.313	9	–	22	.290
Howard	4	–	12	.250	6	–	24	.200
† 2011 MEAC tournament winner As of March 19, 2011; Rankings from AP Poll

The 2010–11 Hampton Pirates men's basketball team represented Hampton University during the 2010–11 NCAA Division I men's basketball season. The Pirates, led by second year head coach Edward Joyner, played their home games at the Hampton Convocation Center and were members of the Mid-Eastern Athletic Conference. They finished the season 24–9, 11–5 in MEAC play to finish in second place. The defeated Maryland Eastern Shore, Norfolk State, and Morgan State to become champions of the MEAC tournament. They received an automatic bid to the NCAA tournament where they lost in the opening round to Duke.

== Roster ==
2010–11 Hampton Pirates men's basketball team
Players
Coaches

Pos.	#	Name	Height	Weight	Year	Hometown
G	1	Derrion Pellum	6 ft 6 in (1.98 m)	205 lb (93 kg)	Jr
F	20	Charles Funches	6 ft 8 in (2.03 m)	210 lb (95 kg)	Sr
G	32	Kwame Morgan	6 ft 3 in (1.91 m)	205 lb (93 kg)	Jr

Head coach

- Edward Joyner

Assistant coach(es)

Legend

- (C) Team captain
- (S) Suspended
- (I) Ineligible
- (W) Walk-on
- Injured
- Current redshirt

== Schedule ==
Date time, TV	Rank^{#}	Opponent^{#}	Result	Record	Site (attendance) city, state
Regular season
Nov 15, 2010*		at Wake Forest; NIT Season Tip-Off	L 56–63	0–1	Lawrence Joel Coliseum (7,570); Winston-Salem, North Carolina
Nov 16, 2010*		vs. Winthrop	W 45–44	1–1	Lawrence Joel Coliseum; Winston-Salem, North Carolina
Nov 19, 2010*		at Fordham	W 58–48	2–1	Rose Hill Gym; Bronx, New York
Nov 22, 2010*		vs. Boston University	W 51–50	3–1	Charles E. Smith Center; Washington, D.C.
Nov 23, 2010*		at George Washington	W 62–51	4–1	Charles E. Smith Center; Washington, D.C.
Nov 28, 2010*		at High Point	W 70–64	5–1	Millis Center; High Point, North Carolina
Nov 30, 2010*		Georgia State	W 60–56 ^{OT}	6–1	Convocation Center; Hampton, Virginia
Dec 4, 2010*		vs. Howard	W 67–55	7–1	Madison Square Garden; New York, New York
Dec 8, 2010*		Delaware	L 53–55	7–2	Convocation Center; Hampton, Virginia
Dec 20, 2010*		Towson	W 78–67	8–2	Convocation Center; Hampton, Virginia
Dec 22, 2010*		Liberty	W 62–59	9–2	Convocation Center; Hampton, Virginia
Dec 29, 2010		vs. Dominican (CA)	W 78–65	10–2 (1–0)	Convocation Center
Dec 30, 2010*		at San Francisco	L 57–69	10–3	War Memorial Gymnasium; San Francisco, California
Jan 1, 2011*		vs. Colorado State	W 77–75	11–3	War Memorial Gymnasium; San Francisco, California
MEAC tournament
Mar 9, 2011*		vs. Maryland-Eastern Shore; Quarterfinals	W 77–55	22–8	Lawrence Joel Coliseum; Winston-Salem, North Carolina
Mar 11, 2011*		vs. Norfolk State; Semifinals	W 85–61	23–8	Lawrence Joel Coliseum; Winston-Salem, North Carolina
Mar 12, 2011*		vs. Morgan State; Championship Game	W 60–55	24–8	Lawrence Joel Coliseum; Winston-Salem, North Carolina
NCAA tournament
Mar 18, 2011*	(16 W)	vs. (1 W) No. 3 Duke; Round of 64	L 45–87	24–9	Time Warner Cable Arena; Charlotte, North Carolina
*Non-conference game. ^{#}Rankings from AP poll. (#) Tournament seedings in parentheses. MW=Midwest Region. All times are in Eastern Time.
