= Clifford Reed =

American college basketball coach (born 1965)

Biographical details
- Born: April 12, 1965 (age 61); Ormond Beach, Florida, U.S.

Playing career
- 1983–1985: St. Johns River CC
- 1989–1991: Bethune–Cookman
- Position: Forward/guard

Coaching career (HC unless noted)
- 1991–1992: Bethune–Cookman (asst.)
- 1992–1995: Mainland HS (JV)
- 1995–1998: Atlantic HS
- 1998–2002: Bethune–Cookman (asst.)
- 2002–2011: Bethune–Cookman
- 2012–2013: Georgia Southern (asst.)
- 2013–2014: Savannah State (asst.)
- 2014–2018: Maryland Eastern Shore (asst.)
- 2018–2019: Maryland Eastern Shore (interim HC)

Head coaching record
- Overall: 132–192 (.407)
- Tournaments: 0–1 (NIT)

Accomplishments and honors

Championships
- MEAC regular season (2011)

Clifford Reed (born April 12, 1965) is an American college basketball coach who last served as the interim head coach at Maryland Eastern Shore. He is also the former head coach at Bethune–Cookman.

== Early life and education ==
Born in Ormond Beach, Florida, Reed graduated from Seabreeze High School in Daytona Beach in 1983 and began his college basketball career at St. Johns Community College, where he played from 1983 to 1985. Reed transferred to Daytona Beach Community College to finish his associate degree. After graduation, Reed served in the United States Army before enrolling at Bethune–Cookman College in 1989 to continue his college basketball career. Reed graduated from Bethune–Cookman in 1991.

== Coaching career ==
Reed's first coaching position was under Horace Broadnax at Bethune–Cookman in the 1991–92 season. The next year, Reed began a two-year stint as junior varsity boys' basketball coach at Mainland High School also in Daytona Beach. Then, from 1994 to 1997, Atlantic High School in Port Orange, Florida, Reed later became an assistant coach (1997 to 2002) again under Broadnax and head coach (2002 to 2011) at Bethune–Cookman.

Reed's most successful season at Bethune–Cookman was in 2010–11, with a 21–13 record, MEAC regular season title, and NIT berth. However, Reed was fired on June 28, 2011 for refusing to cooperate with police in the investigation of a rape accusation against his son C. J. Reed, who had played at Bethune–Cookman from 2009 to 2011; the younger Reed was never charged. In September that year, Reed sued the school. In late September 2016, Bethune–Cookman proposed an undisclosed settlement with Reed.

In 2012, Reed returned to coaching as an assistant at Georgia Southern under Charlton Young then reunited with Broadnax as an assistant coach at Savannah State for the 2013–14 season. In 2014, Reed joined Bobby Collins's staff at Maryland Eastern Shore.

On March 27, 2018, following the announcement that Collins' contract was not renewed the previous day, Maryland Eastern Shore announced that Reed will serve as the interim head coach of the team for the 2018-19 season, and will conduct a national search at the end of the season. After a 7-25 season, Reed was not retained by Maryland-Eastern Shore, as it hired Jason Crafton to be its new head coach.

== Personal life ==
Reed is married to Vera Reed. They have a son, Clifford Jervon "C. J." Reed, who played for his father at Bethune-Cookman from 2009 to 2011 and Georgia Southern from 2012 to 2013.

== Head coaching record ==
Record table
Season	Team	Overall	Conference	Standing	Postseason
Bethune-Cookman Wildcats (Mid-Eastern Athletic Conference) (2002–2011)
2001–02	Bethune-Cookman^{A}	6–5	5–3	8th	
2002–03	Bethune-Cookman	8–22	5–13	T–9th	
2003–04	Bethune-Cookman	8–21	7–11	8th	
2004–05	Bethune-Cookman	13–17	8–10	8th	
2005–06	Bethune-Cookman	15–15	11–7	T–3rd	
2006–07	Bethune-Cookman	9–21	6–12	9th	
2007–08	Bethune-Cookman	11–21	5–11	9th	
2008–09	Bethune-Cookman	17–16	9–7	T–3rd	
2009–10	Bethune-Cookman	17–16	7–9	7th	
2010–11	Bethune-Cookman	21–13	13–3	1st	NIT First Round
Bethune-Cookman:		125–167 (.428)	76–86 (.469)		
Maryland Eastern Shore Hawks (Mid-Eastern Athletic Conference) (2018–2019)
2018–19	Maryland Eastern Shore	7–25	5–11	T–9th	
Maryland Eastern Shore:		7–25 (.219)	5–11 (.313)		
Total:		132–192 (.407)			
National champion Postseason invitational champion Conference regular season champion Conference regular season and conference tournament champion Division regular season champion Division regular season and conference tournament champion Conference tournament champion

== Notes ==
^A Reed took over as interim head coach on February 1, 2002, after the resignation of Horace Broadnax, who started the 2001–02 season 6–12 (3–7 MEAC); their cumulative 2001–02 record was 12–17 (8–11 MEAC).
