= Edward Joyner =

American basketball coach (born 1972)

Current position
- Title: Assistant coach
- Team: Bucknell
- Conference: Patriot League

Biographical details
- Born: June 28, 1972 (age 54)

Playing career
- 1995–1999: Johnson C. Smith

Coaching career (HC unless noted)
- 1999–2006: Johnson C. Smith (assistant)
- 2006–2009: Hampton (assistant)
- 2009–2024: Hampton
- 2024-Present: Bucknell (women's assistant)

Head coaching record
- Overall: 222–257 (.463)
- Tournaments: 1–3 (NCAA Division I); 0–1 (NIT); 0–2 (CBI); 3–1 (CIT)

Accomplishments and honors

Championships
- 2 MEAC regular season (2016, 2018); 3 MEAC tournament (2011, 2015, 2016)

Edward Joyner Jr. (born June 28, 1972) is an American college basketball coach and former head men's basketball coach at Hampton University. He is the all-time winningest coach in the Division I history of Hampton (222). He had previously been an assistant coach at his alma mater Johnson C. Smith University. Currently, he serves as an assistant coach at Bucknell.

== Head coaching record ==
Record table
Season	Team	Overall	Conference	Standing	Postseason
Hampton Pirates (Mid-Eastern Athletic Conference) (2009–2018)
2009–10	Hampton	14–18	8–8	5th	
2010–11	Hampton	24–9	11–5	2nd	NCAA Division I Round of 64
2011–12	Hampton	12–21	6–10	8th	
2012–13	Hampton	14–17	11–5	3rd	
2013–14	Hampton	18–13	13–4	2nd	CBI First Round
2014–15	Hampton	17–18	8–8	6th	NCAA Division I Round of 64
2015–16	Hampton	21–11	13–3	1st	NCAA Division I Round of 64
2016–17	Hampton	14–17	11–5	T–3rd	CBI First Round
2017–18	Hampton	19–16	12–4	T–1st	NIT First Round
Hampton Pirates (Big South Conference) (2018–2022)
2018–19	Hampton	18–17	9–7	T–5th	CIT Semifinal
2019–20	Hampton	15–19	8–10	T–5th	
2020–21	Hampton	11–14	9–9	7th	
2021–22	Hampton	9–19	5–11	6th (North)	
Hampton Pirates (Coastal Athletic Association) (2022–2024)
2022–23	Hampton	8–24	5–13	T–12th	
2023–24	Hampton	9–24	3–15	14th	
Hampton:		222–257 (.463)	132–117 (.530)		
Total:		222–257 (.463)			
National champion Postseason invitational champion Conference regular season champion Conference regular season and conference tournament champion Division regular season champion Division regular season and conference tournament champion Conference tournament champion
