= 2011 MEAC men's basketball tournament =

- Classification: Division I
- Season: 2010–11
- Teams: 11
- Site: Lawrence Joel Veterans Memorial Coliseum; Winston-Salem, North Carolina
- Champions: Hampton (4th title)
- Winning coach: Edward Joyner (1st title)
- Television: ESPN2

2010–11 MEAC men's basketball standings
	Conf.				Overall
Team	W		L	PCT	W		L	PCT
Bethune–Cookman	13	–	3	.813	21	–	13	.618
Hampton †	11	–	5	.688	24	–	9	.727
Coppin State	11	–	5	.688	16	–	14	.533
Morgan State	10	–	6	.625	17	–	14	.548
North Carolina A&T	9	–	7	.563	15	–	17	.469
Norfolk State	8	–	8	.500	12	–	20	.375
Florida A&M	7	–	9	.438	12	–	20	.375
South Carolina State	5	–	11	.313	10	–	22	.313
Delaware State	5	–	11	.313	9	–	21	.300
Maryland Eastern Shore	5	–	11	.313	9	–	22	.290
Howard	4	–	12	.250	6	–	24	.200
† 2011 MEAC tournament winner As of March 19, 2011; Rankings from AP Poll

The 2011 Mid-Eastern Athletic Conference men's basketball tournament took place on March 7–12, 2011 at the Lawrence Joel Veterans Memorial Coliseum in Winston-Salem, North Carolina. The championship game was nationally televised on ESPN2 on Saturday, March 12, 2011, at 2:00 p.m. The tournament champion Hampton received an automatic berth into the 2011 NCAA tournament.

== Bracket ==
First round Tuesday-Wednesday, March 8–9
7	Florida A&M	85
10	Maryland Eastern Shore	87
6	Norfolk State	68
11	Howard	53
8	Delaware State	59
9	South Carolina State	64

Quarterfinals; Wednesday-Thursday, March 9–10
10	Maryland Eastern Shore	55
2	Hampton	77
6	Norfolk State	55
3	Coppin State	53
4	Morgan State	77
5	North Carolina A&T	59
9	South Carolina State	50
1	Bethune–Cookman	66

Semifinals; Friday, March 11
2	Hampton	85
6	Norfolk State	61
4	Morgan State	61
1	Bethune-Cookman	48

Final; Saturday, March 12
2	Hampton	60
4	Morgan State	55

Asterisk denotes game ended in overtime.
