= Maysville, North Carolina =

- Town
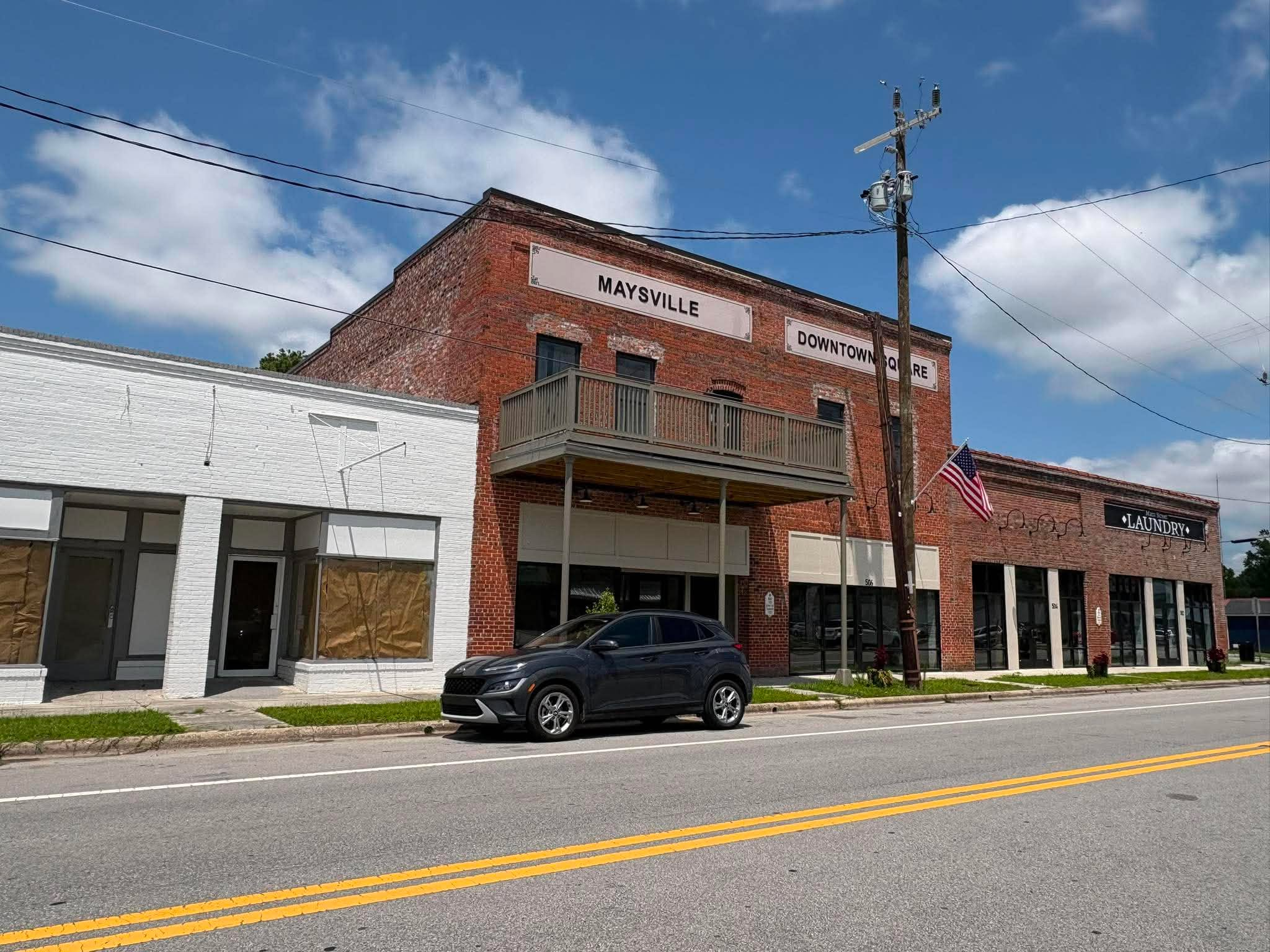
- Downtown Maysville in 2026

- Seal
- Motto: "Naturally Welcoming"
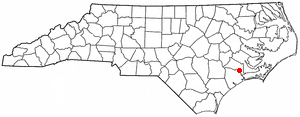
- Location of Maysville, North Carolina
- Coordinates: 34°54′25″N 77°13′57″W
- Country: United States
- State: North Carolina
- County: Jones, Onslow

Area
  - Total: 0.86 sq mi (2.22 km^{2})
  - Land: 0.86 sq mi (2.22 km^{2})
  - Water: 0 sq mi (0.00 km^{2})
- Elevation: 39 ft (12 m)

Population (2020)
  - Total: 818
  - Density: 955.3/sq mi (368.83/km^{2})
- Time zone: UTC-5 (Eastern (EST))
  - Summer (DST): UTC-4 (EDT)
- ZIP code: 28555
- Area codes: 910, 472
- FIPS code: 37-42100
- GNIS feature ID: 2406118
- Website: www.townofmaysville.org

Maysville is a town in Jones County, North Carolina, United States. It is part of the New Bern, North Carolina Metropolitan Statistical Area.

== Etymology ==
Maysville derives its name from an early settler.

== Geography ==
Maysville is located in southeastern Jones County. U.S. Route 17 passes through the center of town, leading north 21 miles (34 km) to New Bern and southwest 15 miles (24 km) to Jacksonville. North Carolina Highway 58 leads southeast from Maysville 20 miles (32 km) to Emerald Isle on the Atlantic coast.

According to the United States Census Bureau, the town has a total area of 0.69 square miles (1.8 km^{2}), all land. It is bordered to the east by Croatan National Forest. The White Oak River runs past the southern end of town.

== Demographics ==
Historical population
Census	Pop.	Note	%±
1900	98		—
1910	345		252.0%
1920	536		55.4%
1930	797		48.7%
1940	732		−8.2%
1950	818		11.7%
1960	892		9.0%
1970	912		2.2%
1980	877		−3.8%
1990	892		1.7%
2000	1,002		12.3%
2010	1,019		1.7%
2020	818		−19.7%
U.S. Decennial Census

=== 2020 census ===
Maysville racial composition
Race	Number	Percentage
White (non-Hispanic)	398	48.66%
Black or African American (non-Hispanic)	338	41.32%
Native American	5	0.61%
Asian	2	0.24%
Other/Mixed	51	6.23%
Hispanic or Latino	24	2.93%

As of the 2020 United States census, there were 818 people, 401 households, and 263 families residing in the town.

=== 2000 census ===
At the 2000 census, there were 1,002 people, 389 households and 255 families residing in the town. The population density was 1,326.8 inhabitants per square mile (512.3/km^{2}). There were 483 housing units at an average density of 639.6 per square mile (247.0/km^{2}). The racial makeup of the town was 40.82% White, 55.89% African American, 0.30% Native American, 0.30% Asian, 0.30% Pacific Islander, 1.40% from other races, and 1.00% from two or more races. Hispanic or Latino of any race were 2.20% of the population.

There were 389 households, of which 34.4% had children under the age of 18 living with them, 39.3% were married couples living together, 20.3% had a female householder with no husband present and 34.2% were non-families. 29.8% of all households were made up of individuals, and 12.6% had someone living alone who was 65 years of age or older. The average household size was 2.58 and the average family size was 3.20.

30.1% of the population were under the age of 18, 6.9% from 18 to 24, 28.7% from 25 to 44, 19.7% from 45 to 64, and 14.6% who were 65 years of age or older. The median age was 35 years. For every 100 females, there were 96.9 males. For every 100 females age 18 and over, there were 88.7 males.

The median household income was $27,750 and the median family income was $34,688. Males had a median income of $30,104 and females $19,048. The per capita income was $11,119. About 19.9% of families and 26.2% of the population were below the poverty line, including 31.1% of those under age 18 and 20.0% of those age 65 or over.

== Education ==
- Maysville Elementary School

== Notable people ==
- Cy Jones, murder victim
- Louie Meadows, baseball player
- Tarvis Williams, basketball player
