= Oscar Mack =

World War I veteran

- Born: September 20, 1892
- Died: January 2, 1960 (aged 67)
- Other names: John Mack; Lanier Johnson
- Children: 3
- Parents: William Mack (father); Marie Mack (mother)

Oscar Mack (September 20, 1892 – January 2, 1960) was an African-American World War I veteran. An attempt was made to lynch Oscar Mack (Newspapers of the time also use the name John Mack) in Kissimmee, Florida. According to the United States Senate Committee on the Judiciary, it was the 39th of 61 lynchings during 1922 in the United States. The New Britain Herald reported that he was lynched in Lake Jennie Jewell, in Orange County.

Mack survived the lynching attempt and fled Florida, ultimately settling in Ohio. He married Dorothy Sanders before 1930. He died in 1960 and was survived by an adopted stepdaughter.

== Early life ==
The 1900 Osceola County, Florida census shows a young Oscar Mack living with his parents, William and Marie Mack, and brothers William Jr. and Charles. William Mack Sr. was born in Georgia in 1864 and worked as a labourer. Oscar's mother was born in North Carolina in 1864 and worked as a laundress. They married in 1888. At 25, Mack enlisted in the U.S. Army on April 26, 1918, fighting in France, and was stationed in Greece. He was honourably discharged on July 17, 1919, and returned to Osceola County, Florida, where he worked as a butcher.

== Ocoee massacre ==
Just over a year before the lynching attempt of Mack was the Ocoee massacre. The Ocoee massacre was an incident of mass racial violence which saw a white mob attack numerous African American residents in the northern parts of Ocoee, Florida, a town located in Orange County near Orlando. The massacre killed dozens of African-Americans and took place on November 2, 1920.

== Lynching attempt ==
In 1922, he bid for a federal contract to move mail from the Kissimmee railroad depot to the post office while looking for employment. His winning bid undercut another contractor who verbally threatened Mack. When Mack told his boss, Assistant Postmaster C.C. Collins, about the threats, Collins gave him a gun.

After Mack's first day of work three "white men — likely Klansmen — came to his house." There was an altercation, and Mack used the gun given to him by Collins. In the shootout, Gene Rinehart was killed, Stewart Ivey died of his wounds a few days later, and the third assailant A.C. Aldeman, escaped unharmed.

When word of the killing of two white men by Mack spread, a huge mob gathered. The mob hunted Oscar Mack and terrorized the local Black community, and almost 200 African-American families left the area. At one point, a Black man was held by the mob, but it wasn't Mack. However, the local sheriff convinced the mob to release the innocent man. On July 19, 1922, newspapers like the New Britain Herald reported that Oscar Mack was lynched in Lake Jennie Jewell, in Orange County.

Assistant Postmaster C.C. Collins was forced to relocate to Tampa, Florida, after giving Oscar a gun to defend himself.

== Later life ==
Oscar Mack escaped the mob via the Florida Swamps and made his way out of the State where he changed his name to Lanier Johnson. He married Dorothy Adell (Keen) Sanders, a divorcee, prior to 1930 and adopted Dorothy's child Florida Mae Sanders. They moved from state to state worried the KKK would find them. Moving from New Jersey to Connecticut, Youngstown, Ohio, and finally settling in Akron, Ohio, where they can be found enumerated on the 1930 census, living on Palmer street. On 24 February 1943, Oscar's wife Dorothea died as a result of a cerebral hemorrhage. She was only 46 years old. He died in Akron, January 2, 1960. Mack is buried in Glendale Cemetery in Akron. His wife is buried at Mt. Peace Cemetery, also in Akron. Both are buried under the name Johnson.

== Bibliography ==
Notes

References

- "Negro is lynched". New Britain Herald. New Britain, Hartford County, Connecticut: Herald Pub. Co. July 19, 1922. pp. 1–14. ISSN 2325-4548. OCLC 173714341.
- Herring, Troy (December 21, 2017). "Rollins professor Julian Chambliss and his class dived into the mystery of a man thought to be hanged". Orange Observer.
- "Both victims of Kissimmee shooting dead". The Lakeland Evening Telegram. Lakeland, Polk, Florida: Harry L. Brown. July 18, 1922. pp. 1–12. ISSN 2574-5670. OCLC 33414061.
- "Both victims of Kissimmee shooting dead". The Lakeland Evening Telegram. Lakeland, Polk, Florida: Harry L. Brown. July 20, 1922. pp. 1–12. ISSN 2574-5670. OCLC 33414061.
- "Assassin has made a temporary escape". The Ocala Evening Star. Ocala, Marion, Florida: Porter & Harding. July 18, 1922. pp. 1–4. ISSN 1943-8869. OCLC 11319113.
- United States Senate Committee on the Judiciary (1926). "To Prevent and Punish the Crime of Lynching: Hearings Before the United States Senate Committee on the Judiciary, Subcommittee on S. 121, Sixty-Ninth Congress, First Session, on Feb. 16, 1926". United States Government Publishing Office.

| Number | Name | Date | Place | Method of lynching | Number of victims |
|---|---|---|---|---|---|
| 1 | Bill McAllister | January 8, 1922 | Williamsburg, S.C. | Shot | 1 |
| 2 | Lincoln Hickson | January 8, 1922 | Williamsburg, S.C. | Shot | 1 |
| 3 | Willie Jenkins | January 10, 1922 | Eufaula, Alabama | Shot | 1 |
| 4 | Jake Brooks | January 14, 1922 | Oklahoma City, Oklahoma | Hanged | 1 |
| 5 | Charles Strong | January 17, 1922 | Mayo, Florida | Hanged | 1 |
| 6 | Will Bell | January 29, 1922 | Pontotoc, Mississippi | Shot | 1 |
| 7 | Unidentified | January 29, 1922 | Pontotoc, Mississippi | Shot | |
| 8 | Drew Conner (White) | January 28, 1922 | Bolinger, Alabama | Burned | 1 |
| 9 | Will Thrasher | February 1, 1922 | Crystal Springs, Mississippi | Hanged | 1 |
| 10 | Harry Harrison | February 2, 1922 | Malvern, Arkansas | Shot | 1 |
| 11 | Manuel Duarte | February 2, 1922 | Cameron County, Texas | Shot | 1 |
| 12 | P. Norman | February 11, 1922 | Texarkana, Arkansas | Shot | 1 |
| 13 | Will Jones | February 13, 1922 | Ellaville, Georgia | Shot | 1 |
| 14 | William Baker | March 8, 1922 | Aberdeen, Mississippi | Hanged | 1 |
| 15 | Alfred Williams | March 12, 1922 | Harlem, Georgia | Hanged | 1 |
| 16 | Brown Culpepper (White) | March 13, 1922 | Holly Grove, Louisiana | Shot | 1 |
| 17 | Jerry Ingram | March 17, 1922 | Crawford, Mississippi | Shot | 1 |
| 18 | Unidentified (white) | March 19, 1922 | Okay, Oklahoma | Drowned | 1 |
| 19 | Alexander Smith | March 22, 1922 | Gulfport, Mississippi | Hanged | 1 |
| 20 | Snap Curry | May 6, 1922 | Kirvin, Texas | Burned | 1 |
| 21 | H. Varney (or Johnnie Cornish) | May 6, 1922 | Kirvin, Texas | Burned | 1 |
| 22 | Mose Jones | May 6, 1922 | Kirvin, Texas | Burned | 1 |
| 23 | Tom Cornish | May 8, 1922 | Kirvin, Texas | Hanged | 1 |
| 24 | Thomas Early | May 17, 1922 | Conroe, Texas | Burned | 1 |
| 25 | Charles Atkins | May 18, 1922 | Davisboro, Georgia | Burned | 1 |
| 26 | Hullen Owens | May 19, 1922 | Texarkana, Texas | Hanged (body burned) | 1 |
| 27 | Joe Winters | May 20, 1922 | Conroe, Texas | Burned | 1 |
| 28 | Mose Bozier | May 20, 1922 | Alleyton, Texas | Hanged | 1 |
| 29 | Gilbert Wilson | May 23, 1922 | Bryan, Texas | Beaten to death | 1 |
| 30 | Jesse Thomas | May 26, 1922 | Waco, Texas | Shot (body burned) | 1 |
| 31 | William Byrd | May 28, 1922 | Brentwood, Georgia | Shot (body burned) | 1 |
| 32 | Robert Collins | June 20, 1922 | Summit, Mississippi | Hanged | 1 |
| 33 | Warren Lewis | June 23, 1922 | New Dacus, Texas | Hanged | 1 |
| 34 | James Harvey | July 1, 1922 | Lanes Bridge, Georgia | Hanged | 1 |
| 35 | Joe Jordan | July 1, 1922 | Lanes Bridge, Georgia | Hanged | 1 |
| 36 | Philip Tankard | July 5, 1922 | Belhaven, North Carolina | Shot | 1 |
| 37 | Joe Pemberton | July 7, 1922 | Benton, Louisiana | Hanged | 1 |
| 38 | Jake "Shake" Davis | July 14, 1922 | Miller County, Georgia | Hanged | 1 |
| 39 | Oscar Mack | July 18, 1922 | Orange County, Florida | Hanged (False report, Oscar Mack survived) | 1 |
| 40 | Will Anderson | July 24, 1922 | Allentown, Georgia | Shot | 1 |
| 41 | John West | July 28, 1922 | Guernsey, Arkansas | Shot | 1 |
| 42 | Gilbert Harris | August 1, 1922 | Hot Springs, Arkansas | Hanged | 1 |
| 43 | John Glover | August 1, 1922 | Holton, | Shot | 1 |
| 44 | Bayner Blackwell | August 6, 1922 | Swansboro, North Carolina | Shot | 1 |
| 45 | John Steelman | August 23, 1922 | Lambert, Mississippi | Burned | 1 |
| 46 | Thomas Rivers | August 30, 1922 | Bossier Parish, Louisiana | Hanged | 1 |
| 47 | F. Watt Daniels (White) | August 1922 | Mer Rouge, Louisiana | Ku-Klux Klan | 1 |
| 48 | Thomas F. Richards (White) | August 1922 | Mer Rouge, Louisiana | Ku-Klux Klan | 1 |
| 49 | Jim Reed Long | September 2, 1922 | Winder, Georgia | Ku-Klux Klan | 1 |
| 50 | O.J. Johnson | September 7, 1922 | Newton, Texas | Hanged | 1 |
| 51 | Jim Johnston | September 28, 1922 | Sandersville, Georgia | Hanged | 1 |
| 52 | Grover C. Everett | September 28, 1922 | Abilene, Texas | Shot | 1 |
| 53 | John Brown | October 3, 1922 | Montgomery, Alabama | Shot | 1 |
| 54 | Ed Hartley (white) | October 20, 1922 | Camden, Tennessee | Shot | 1 |
| 55 | George Hartley (white) | October 20, 1922 | Camden, Tennessee | Shot | 1 |
| 56 | Elias V. Zarate | November 11, 1922 | Weslaco, Texas | Shot | 1 |
| 57 | Cupid Dickson / Cubrit Dixon | December 5, 1922 | Madison, Florida | Shot | 1 |
| 58 | Charles Wright | December 8 ,1922 | Perry, Florida | Burned | 1 |
| 59 | Less Smith | December 9, 1922 | Morrilton, Arkansas | Burned | 1 |
| 60 | George Gay | December 11, 1922 | Streetman, Texas | Hanged | 1 |
| 61 | Arthur Young | December 11, 1922 | Perry, Florida | Hanged | 1 |
