= Devin Green =

American basketball player (born 1982)

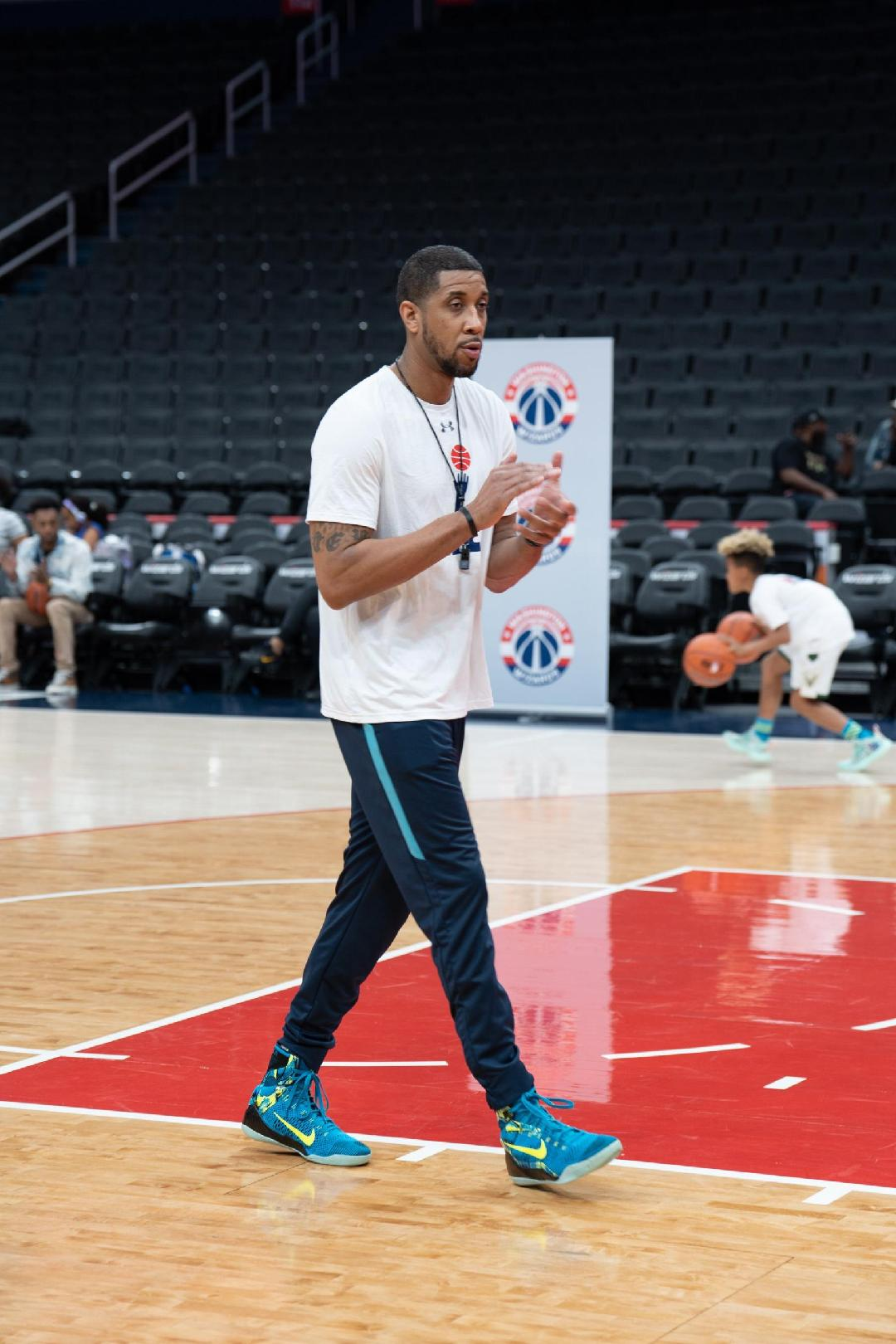

Personal information
- Born: October 25, 1982 (age 44) Akron, Ohio, U.S.
- Listed height: 6 ft 7 in (2.01 m)
- Listed weight: 215 lb (98 kg)

Career information
- High school: Beechcroft (Columbus, Ohio)
- College: Hampton (2001–2005)
- NBA draft: 2005: undrafted
- Playing career: 2005–2019
- Position: Shooting guard / small forward

Career history
- 2005–2006: Los Angeles Lakers
- 2006: Los Angeles D-Fenders
- 2006–2007: RheinEnergie Köln
- 2007–2008: Los Angeles D-Fenders
- 2008: Teramo Basket
- 2008: Base Oostende
- 2009: Dnipro
- 2009–2010: Olympia Larissa
- 2010: Gallitos de Isabela
- 2010: Changan Guangdong
- 2010–2011: Shanghai Sharks
- 2011: Lukoil Academic
- 2011–2012: Erie BayHawks
- 2012: Idaho Stampede
- 2012–2013: Lukoil Academic
- 2013–2014: Spirou Charleroi
- 2014–2015: Guaros de Lara
- 2016: Ostioneros de Guaymas
- 2016: Barreteros de Zacatecas
- 2017: Atlético Echagüe
- 2017: Champville SC
- 2018: Wuhan Dangdai
- 2019: Al Sadd
- 2019: Wuhan Dangdai
- 2019: GS Pétroliers

Career highlights
- Road to BAL West Division champion (2020); Venezuelan League Champion (2014); Bulgarian League Champion (2011); Bulgarian Cup winner (2011); German Cup winner (2007); 2× First-team All-MEAC (2004, 2005); MEAC Champion (2002); Rookie of the Year MEAC (2002)
- Stats at NBA.com
- Stats at Basketball Reference

Devin Green (born October 25, 1982) is an American former professional basketball player. He played college basketball for the Hampton Pirates, finishing in 2005. After his tenure at Hampton University, he joined the Los Angeles Lakers for the 2005–2006 season.

== Professional career ==
He was undrafted out of Hampton University, and was signed by the Los Angeles Lakers as a free agent, appearing in 27 games in the 2005–2006 season. On October 30, 2006, he was waived by the Lakers. Green played for the NBDL team the Los Angeles D-Fenders halfway through the season of 2006–07, but then left for the German Basketball League team RheinEnergie Köln. As a member of RheinEnergie Köln, he won the 2006–07 German National Cup and helped reach the German national championship semi-finals.

He signed a contract with the Miami Heat on August 11, 2007, but was waived on October 29, 2007, from the team. In February 2008, he signed for the Italian First Division team of Siviglia Wear Teramo.

Green made another attempt to enter the NBA with the San Antonio Spurs in 2008 but was cut a week before the start of the regular season. He signed with Base Oostende, a top Belgian League club on October 31, 2008.

Green reported to Las Vegas on July 9, 2009, to participate in the 2009 NBA Summer League as a member of the Minnesota Timberwolves. Green's summer was the subject of a documentary titled "Devin Green: The Journey." The first four episodes are currently available on YouTube and at Green's Website.

In January 2011 he signed with PBC Lukoil Academic in Bulgaria.

During the 2011–12 season, Green played with the Erie BayHawks and Idaho Stampede of the NBA D-League.

In the summer of 2012, Green re-signed with PBC Lukoil Academic. In January 2013, he was released. Later that month he signed with Spirou Charleroi. He parted ways with Spirou Charleroi in March 2014. He then signed with Guaros de Lara of Venezuela. In April 2015, he left Guaros de Lara.

In June, 2019, Green comeback to the Wuhan Dangdai of the National Basketball League.

In the end of 2019, Green played for GS Pétroliers in the Road to BAL and helped the team win the West Division and qualify for the 2021 BAL season.
