= Atlantic High School (Florida) =

- 1250 Reed Canal Road; Port Orange, Florida 32129; United States

Information
- Type: Public High School
- Motto: "Living the Vision"
- Established: 1994
- School district: Volusia County Schools
- Principal: Jason Watson
- Teaching staff: 67.80 (FTE)
- Grades: 9 to 12
- Enrollment: 1,227 (2023-2024)
- Student to teacher ratio: 18.10
- Color
- Slogan: The School of Opportunity
- Sports: Varsity teams and Junior Varsity teams
- Mascot: Sharks
- Nickname: AHS, ATL
- Team name: Atlantic Sharks
- Website: atlanticsharks.com

Atlantic High School is a public high school located in Port Orange, Florida, United States. The school opened in 1994 and currently serves about 1,300 students in grades 9 to 12 as part of the Volusia County Schools system.

== Career and Technical Education Academies ==
Atlantic High School was an early adopter of career and technical education (CTE) academies, programs within schools that afford students a customized curriculum in their area of interest. Atlantic High School currently operates the following CTE academies:

- Academy of Law and Government (ALAG)
- Academy of Automotive Technology, and Maintenance
- Academy of Teaching, Education, and Learning (TEAL)
- Academy of Technology, Engineering, Science, and Aerospace (TESA)
- Gaming and Simulation Academy
- Sports Media and Marketing Academy

== Athletics ==
The schools athletic teams are known as the Atlantic Sharks. Sports typically offered include football, baseball, softball, volleyball, and girl's flag football.

The school has a history of athletic accomplishments, including being the Women's Bowling State Champions in 2010 and 2014, the Men's Basketball District Champions in 2016, the Tennis State Champions in 2016, and the Girl's Flag Football District Champions in 2025 and 2026.

== Notable Alumni ==
- Ronni Williams, Florida Gators and Indiana Fever basketball player
