= Tarvis Williams =

American basketball player

Personal information
- Born: January 22, 1978 (age 48) Maysville, North Carolina, U.S.
- Listed height: 6 ft 7 in (2.01 m)
- Listed weight: 200 lb (91 kg)

Career information
- High school: White Oak (Jacksonville, North Carolina)
- College: Hampton (1997–2001)
- NBA draft: 2001: undrafted
- Playing career: 2001–2012
- Position: Power forward

Career history
- 2001–2002: Shanghai Sharks
- 2003: Mitteldeutscher BC
- 2003–2004: Fayetteville Patriots
- 2004: Sigal Prishtina
- 2004–2005: BK Děčín
- 2005–2006: Olympique Antibes
- 2006–2007: Mlekarna Kunin Novi Jicin
- 2007–2008: BK Synthesia Pardubice
- 2008–2009: Bayern Munich
- 2009: BK Děčín
- 2009–2010: JSA Bordeaux Basket
- 2010: BC Prievidza
- 2010–2011: BG Karlsruhe
- 2011–2012: BK Děčín

Career highlights
- MEAC Player of the Year (2001); 3× First-team All-MEAC (1999–2001); 2× NCAA blocks leader (1999, 2001)

Tarvis Devar Williams (born January 22, 1978) is an American former professional basketball player. He is best known, however, for making the game-winning shot with 6.9 seconds left that propelled 15th-seeded Hampton past 2nd-seeded Iowa State, 58–57, in the first round of the 2001 NCAA Men's Division I Basketball Tournament. It was only the fourth time since 1985 that a #15 defeated a #2 seed. Williams was also a two-time NCAA season blocks champion in 1998–99 and 2000–01.

== Early life ==
Williams was born in Maysville, North Carolina. He attended White Oak High School in Jacksonville, North Carolina, where he graduated in 1996.

== College career ==
Tarvis Williams played college basketball at Hampton University in Hampton, Virginia from 1997–98 to 2000–01. He played in 114 games and averaged 15.4 points, 6.4 rebounds and 3.8 blocks per game for his career. As a sophomore in 1998–99 he led the nation in blocks per game with 5.00. He repeated the achievement two years later as a senior when he averaged 4.59 per game. He was only the second player in NCAA Division I history to lead the country in blocks for two seasons since the statistic became official in 1985–86 (Hall of Famer David Robinson was the first, who accomplished the feat in 1986 and 1987.) For his career, Williams blocked 452 shots, which through the 2021–22 season ranks seventh-most in Division I history. In the 2000 and 2001 Mid-Eastern Athletic Conference (MEAC) Tournaments, Williams was selected to the All-Tournament team and named the MVP in 2001. After his final collegiate season he was selected to play in the Portsmouth Invitational Tournament to try and impress NBA scouts, but his sub-par performance resulted in not being chosen in the 2001 NBA draft. Williams finished his career at Hampton with 1,754 points and owns school records in every single blocked shot category: single game (12), single season (147), career, season average (4.59 bpg), and career average (3.8 bpg).

== Professional career ==
After being passed up by NBA teams, Williams left the United States to play professional basketball. Since his career began in 2001 he has been a journeyman, playing for 11 different teams in seven countries. His most successful season to date was in 2004–05 while playing for BK Děčín in the Czech Republic's National Basketball League. In 37 games, Williams averaged 16.4 points, 8.8 rebounds and 2.6 blocks per game. He was third in the league in rebounding average while also tops in blocks.

== See also ==
- List of NCAA Division I men's basketball season blocks leaders
- List of NCAA Division I men's basketball career blocks leaders
