= Tommy Adams (basketball) =

American basketball player (born 1980)

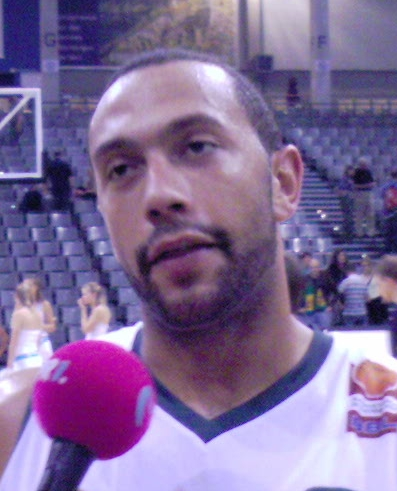
- Adams in 2006

Personal information
- Born: January 15, 1980 (age 46) Woodbridge, Virginia, U.S.
- Listed height: 6 ft 3 in (1.91 m)

Career information
- High school: C. D. Hylton (Woodbridge, Virginia)
- College: Hampton (1998–2002)
- NBA draft: 2002: undrafted
- Playing career: 2002–present
- Position: Shooting guard

Career history
- 2002–2003: Mansfield Hawks
- 2003: Adirondack Wildcats
- 2003–2004: Yakima Sun Kings
- 2004: Jiangsu Dragons
- 2004–2005: Great Lakes Storm
- 2005: Idaho Stampede
- 2005: Cocodrilos de Caracas
- 2005–2006: 08 Stockholm Human Rights
- 2006: Ironi Ramat-Gan
- 2006–2007: TBB Trier
- 2007: Eisbären Bremerhaven
- 2007–2008: Stal Ostrow Wielkopolski
- 2008–2009: Polonia Warszawa
- 2009: Anwil Wloclawek
- 2009–2010: Fileni Jesi
- 2010: Scafati Basket
- 2010–2011: Limoges CSP
- 2011-Present: Asseco Prokom Gdynia

Career highlights
- MEAC Player of the Year (2002)

Thomas Maurice Adams (born January 15, 1980) is an American professional basketball player who last played for Asseco Prokom Gdynia in Poland.

The 1.91 m guard played for Hampton University in the US and came to TBB Trier in 2006 via stations in Sweden and Israel (Ironi Ramat Gan). Adams switched to the Eisbären Bremerhaven for the 2007/08 season, but his contract was terminated in November 2007. Adams then moved to Poland to Atlas Stal Ostrow.

== Awards ==
- MEAC Player of the Year (2002)
