= Hampton Pirates basketball =

2026–27 Hampton Pirates basketball team
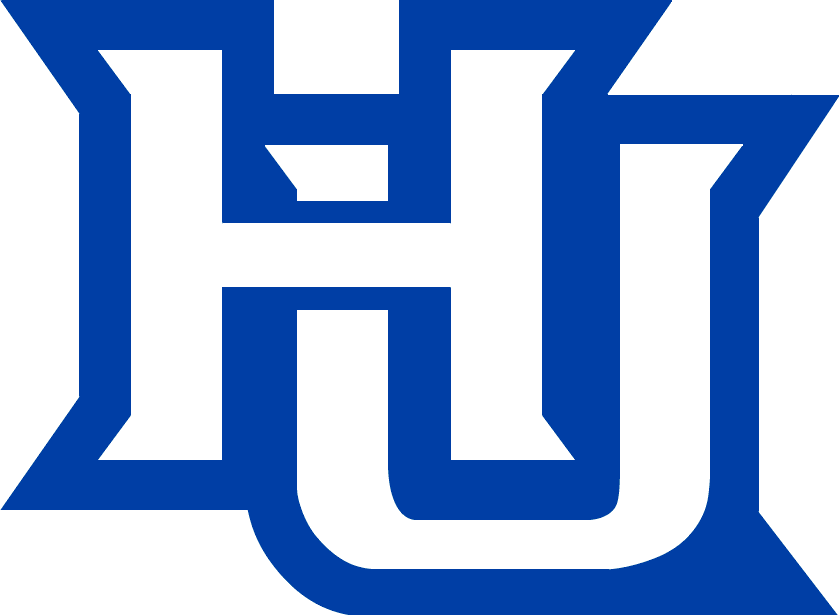
- University: Hampton University
- Head coach: Ivan Thomas (3rd season)
- Location: Hampton, Virginia
- Arena: Hampton Convocation Center (capacity: 7,200)
- Conference: Coastal Athletic Association
- Nickname: Pirates
- Colors: Reflex blue and white

NCAA Division I tournament round of 32
- 1991*, 2001

NCAA Division I tournament appearances
- 1991*, 2001, 2002, 2006, 2011, 2015, 2016

Conference tournament champions
- MEAC: 2001, 2002, 2006, 2011, 2015, 2016; CIAA: 1982, 1983, 1991

Conference regular-season champions
- 2001, 2002, 2016, 2018

Uniforms
Home	Away
- * at Division II level

The Hampton Pirates basketball team is the men's basketball team that represents Hampton University in Hampton, Virginia, United States. The Pirates compete in the Coastal Athletic Association. The school's team formerly competed in the Mid-Eastern Athletic Conference, and the Big South Conference. Hampton has appeared six times in the NCAA Division I men's basketball tournament, most recently in 2016. The Pirates advanced to the Round of 32 of the NCAA tournament in 2001; the 2000–01 Hampton team was one of ten 15 seeds ever to upset a 2 seed in the Round of 64 of an NCAA tournament, defeating Iowa State in the first round 58–57.

== Postseason results ==
=== NCAA Division I tournament results ===
The Pirates have appeared in the NCAA Division I tournament six times. Their combined record is 2–6.

Year	Seed	Round	Opponent	Result
2001	#15	Round of 64; Round of 32	#2 Iowa State #10 Georgetown	W 58–57; L 57–76
2002	#15	Round of 64	#2 Connecticut	L 67–78
2006	#16	Opening Round	#16 Monmouth	L 49–71
2011	#16	Round of 64	#1 Duke	L 45–87
2015	#16	First Four; Round of 64	#16 Manhattan #1 Kentucky	W 74–64; L 56–79
2016	#16	Round of 64	#1 Virginia	L 45–81

=== NIT results ===
The Pirates have appeared in the National Invitation Tournament (NIT) one time. Their record is 0–1.

Year	Round	Opponent	Result
2018	First round	Notre Dame	L 63–84

=== CBI results ===
The Pirates have appeared in the College Basketball Invitational (CBI) two times. Their combined record is 0–2.

Year	Round	Opponent	Result
2014	First round	Penn State	L 65–69
2017	First round	Coastal Carolina	L 67–83

=== CIT results ===
The Pirates have appeared in the CollegeInsider.com Postseason Tournament (CIT), one time. Their record is 3–1.

Year	Round	Opponent	Result
2019	First round Second Round; Quarterfinals; Semifinals	St. Francis Brooklyn; Charleston Southern; NJIT; Marshall	W 81–72; W 73–67; W 82–70; L 78–80

=== NCAA Division II tournament results ===
The Pirates have appeared in the NCAA Division II tournament one time. Their record is 1–1.

Year	Round	Opponent	Result
1991	Regional semifinals Regional 3rd-place game	North Alabama; Florida Southern	L 80–94; W 70–68

=== NAIA tournament results ===
The Pirates have appeared in the NAIA tournament three times. Their combined record is 4–3.

Year	Round	Opponent	Result
1978	First round	Central State	L 64–76
1980	First round	South Carolina–Aiken	L 73–74
1982	First round Second Round; Quarterfinals; Semifinals; National 3rd-place game	Oklahoma Christian; Central Washington; Henderson State; South Carolina Upstate; Kearney State	W 65–64; W 63–49; W 70–66; L 54–68; W 98–94

== Award winners ==
=== MEAC Player of the Year ===
- Tarvis Williams (2001)
- Tommy Adams (2002)
