= 2025–26 Mid-Eastern Athletic Conference men's basketball season =

College men's basketball season

- League: NCAA Division I
- Sport: Basketball
- Teams: 8
- TV partner(s): ESPN, ESPN+, ESPNU

Regular season
- Regular season champion: Howard (6th title)
- Season MVP: Bryce Harris (Howard)

MEAC tournament
- Venue: Norfolk Scope, Norfolk, VA
- Champions: Howard (6th title)
- Runners-up: NC Central
- Tournament MVP: Bryce Harris

MEAC men's basketball seasons
- ← 2024–25 2026–27 →

2025–26 MEAC men's basketball standings
	Conf.				Overall
Team	W		L	PCT	W		L	PCT
Howard †	11	–	3	.786	24	–	11	.686
Morgan State	10	–	4	.714	14	–	16	.467
North Carolina Central	8	–	6	.571	14	–	18	.438
Norfolk State	8	–	6	.571	15	–	17	.469
South Carolina State	7	–	7	.500	10	–	22	.313
Maryland Eastern Shore	5	–	9	.357	9	–	23	.281
Coppin State*	5	–	9	.357	7	–	24	.226
Delaware State	2	–	12	.143	8	–	23	.258
† 2026 MEAC tournament winner * Ineligible for both the 2026 NCAA Tournament and MEAC tournament due to APR penalties.

The 2025–26 Mid-Eastern Athletic Conference (MEAC) men's basketball season started with non-conference play on November 3, 2025, and conference play started on January 3, 2026. The regular season ended on March 5, 2026, and set up the 2026 MEAC men's basketball tournament, which took place from March 11 to 14, 2026 at the Norfolk Scope in Norfolk, Virginia.

== Head coaches ==
=== Coaches ===
Team	Head Coach	Previous Job	Years At School (Note: Year at school includes 2025–26 season.)	Record at School (Note: Overall and MEAC records are from the time at their current school and are through the end of the 2024–25 season.)	MEAC Record	MEAC Titles	NCAA tournaments (Note: NCAA tournament appearances are from the time at current school only.)	NCAA Sweet 16's
Coppin State	Larry Stewart	Maryland Eastern Shore (Assistant)	3	8–51	5–23	0	0	0
Delaware State	Stan Waterman	Sanford School	5	39–83	18–38	0	0	0
Howard	Kenny Blakeney	Columbia (Assistant)	7	73–96	37–35	2	2	0
Morgan State	Kevin Broadus	Maryland (Assistant)	7	82–93	45–39	0	0	0
Norfolk State	Robert Jones	Norfolk State (Interim HC)	13	236–159	135–45	3	3	0
North Carolina Central	LeVelle Moton	NC Central (Assistant)	17	278–216	144–63	4	4	0
South Carolina State	Erik Martin	West Virginia (Assistant)	4	39–57	22–20	0	0	0
Maryland Eastern Shore	Cleo Hill Jr.	Winston-Salem State	2	6–25	2–12	0	0	0

== Preseason awards ==
The preseason MEAC men's basketball polls were released on October 8, 2025, at the conference's media day in Norfolk, Virginia.

=== Preseason Poll ===
First place votes in parentheses

1. Norfolk State (12) – 118 pts
2. Howard (4) – 97
3. South Carolina State – 90
4. Morgan State – 73
5. Delaware State – 70
6. North Carolina Central – 70
7. Maryland Eastern Shore – 31
8. Coppin State – 27

=== Preseason honors ===
Honor	Recipient	School
Preseason Player of the Year	Jayden Johnson	South Carolina State
Preseason All-MEAC First Team	Chris Flippin	Maryland Eastern Shore
Preseason All-MEAC First Team	Bryce Harris	Howard
Preseason All-MEAC First Team	Khalil Horton	Coppin State
Preseason All-MEAC First Team	Ponce James	Delaware State
Preseason All-MEAC First Team	Jayden Johnson	South Carolina State
Preseason All-MEAC Second Team	Zion Bethea	Delaware State
Preseason All-MEAC Second Team	Cam Gillus	Howard
Preseason All-MEAC Second Team	Dionte Johnson	North Carolina Central
Preseason All-MEAC Second Team	Camian Shell	Delaware State
Preseason All-MEAC Second Team	Taj Thweatt	Coppin State
Preseason All-MEAC Third Team	Keyontae Lewis	Norfolk State
Preseason All-MEAC Third Team	Anthony McComb III	Norfolk State
Preseason All-MEAC Third Team	Walter Peggs Jr.	Morgan State
Preseason All-MEAC Third Team	Cedric Taylor III	Howard
Preseason All-MEAC Third Team	Michael Teal	Maryland Eastern Shore

== Regular season ==
=== Conference standings ===
Thru March 5, 2026

		Conference		Overall		
Rank	Team	Record	Percent	Record	Percent	Tiebreaker
1	Howard	11–3	.786	23–10	.697	
2	Morgan State	10–4	.714	14–16	.467	
3	North Carolina Central	8–6	.571	14–18	.438	2–0 vs. Morgan State
4	Norfolk State	8–6	.571	15–17	.469	0–2 vs. Morgan State
5	South Carolina State	7–7	.500	10–22	.313	
6	Maryland Eastern Shore	5–9	.357	9–23	.281	1–1 vs. Howard
7	Coppin State	5–9	.357	7–24	.226	0–2 vs. Howard
8	Delaware State	2–12	.143	8–23	.258	

=== Conference matrix ===
	Coppin State	Delaware State	Howard	Morgan State	Norfolk State	NC Central	South Carolina State	Maryland Eastern Shore
vs. Coppin State	–	0–1	0–0	0–0	1–0	1–0	1–0	1–0
vs. Delaware State	1–0	–	1–0	1–0	1–0	0–0	0–0	0–0
vs. Howard	0–0	0–1	–	1–0	0–0	0–1	1–0	1–0
vs. Morgan State	0–0	0–1	0–1	–	0–0	1–0	0–1	1–0
vs. Norfolk State	0–1	0–1	0–0	0–0	–	1–0	0–1	1–0
vs. North Carolina Central	0–1	0–0	1–0	0–1	0–1	–	0–0	0–0
vs. South Carolina State	0–1	0–0	0–1	1–0	1–0	0–0	–	0–0
vs. Maryland Eastern Shore	0–1	0–0	0–1	0–1	0–1	0–0	0–0	–
Total	1–4	0–4	2–3	3–2	3–2	3–1	2–2	4–0

Thru January 24, 2026

=== Players of the Week ===
Week	Player of the Week	Rookie of the Week	Defender of the Week
Nov. 10	Gage Lattimore; NC Central	My'kel Jenkins; Norfolk State	Khouri Carvey; NC Central
Nov. 17	Gage Lattimore (**2**); NC Central	My'kel Jenkins (**2**); Norfolk State	Bryce Harris; Howard
Nov. 24	Bryce Harris; Howard	Jeremiah Johnson; Howard	DeMariontay Hall; Coppin State
Dec. 1	Bryce Harris (**2**); Howard	Danas Kazakevicius; Howard	Dionte Johnson; NC Central
Dec. 8	Corey Perkins; Delaware State	Nelson Lamizana; Coppin State	Miles Webb; Delaware State
Dec. 15	Bryce Harris (**3**); Howard	Danas Kazakevicius (**2**); Howard	Cam Gillus; Howard
Dec. 22	Elijah Jamison; Norfolk State	Adrean Newton; Norfolk State	Khouri Carvey (**2**); NC Central
Dec. 29	Khali Horton; Coppin State	Not awarded	Not awarded
Jan. 5	Jayden Johnson; South Carolina State	Nelson Lamizana (**2**); Coppin State	Khouri Carvey (**3**); NC Central
Jan. 12	Anthony McComb III; Norfolk State	Adrean Newton (**2**); Norfolk State	Miles Webb (**2**); Delaware State
Jan. 19	Ose Okojie; Howard	Noah Treadwell; South Carolina State	Khouri Carvey (**4**); NC Central
Jan. 26	Anthony McComb III (**2**); Norfolk State	Adrean Newton (**3**); Norfolk State	Cedric Taylor III; Howard
Feb. 2	Alfred Worrell Jr. Morgan State	Marland Harris; Morgan State	Daveyon Lydner; Coppin State
Feb. 9	Cedric Taylor III; Howard	Bryce Harris; Howard	Daveyon Lydner (**2**); Coppin State
Feb. 9	Cedric Taylor III; Howard	Marland Harris (**2**); Morgan State	Daveyon Lydner (**2**); Coppin State
Feb. 16	Cedric Taylor III (**2**); Howard	Bryce Harris (**2**); Howard	Daveyon Lydner (**3**); Coppin State
Feb. 23	Cedric Taylor III (**3**); Howard	Adrean Newton (**4**); Norfolk State	Cameron Sparrow; Coppin State
Feb. 23	Elijah Davis; Morgan State	Adrean Newton (**4**); Norfolk State	Cameron Sparrow; Coppin State
Mar. 2	Bryce Harris (**4**); Howard	Not awarded	Kelechi Okworogwo; NC Central
Mar. 9	Cam Gillus; Howard	Noah Treadwell (**2**); South Carolina State	DeMariontay Hall (**2**); Coppin State

=== Records against other conferences ===
Thru January 25, 2026

Major 6 Conferences	Record	Major 6 Conferences	Record
ACC	0–11	American	0–3
Big East	0–4	Big Ten	0–5
Big 12	0–3	SEC	0–7
Major 6 Total			0–33
Other Division I Conferences	Record	Other Division I Conferences	Record
Atlantic 10	0–5	ASUN	0–2
America East	1–3	Big Sky	0–0
Big South	2–7	Big West	0–1
CAA	5–9	Conference USA	2–1
Horizon League	0–0	Ivy League	0–0
Independents	0–0	MAAC	3–3
MAC	0–1	MVC	0–0
MWC	0–1	NEC	0–3
OVC	0–0	Patriot League	0–4
SoCon	0–2	Southland	0–0
**SWAC**	**2–3**	Summit League	0–1
Sun Belt	0–8	WAC	0–0
WCC	0–2		
Other Division I Total			15–56
NCAA Division I Total			15–89
NCAA Division II Total			6–1
NCAA Division III Total			6–0
NAIA Total			2–0
NCCAA/USCAA Total			7–0
Total Non-Conference Record			36–90

=== Record against ranked non-conference opponents ===
MEAC records against ranked teams (rankings from AP Poll, MEAC teams in Bold):

Thru January 25, 2026

Date	Visitor	Home	Site	Score	Conference record
November 3	South Carolina State	No. 11 Louisville	KFC Yum! Center; Louisville, KY	45–104	0–1
November 14	NC Central	No. 18 North Carolina	Dean E. Smith Center; Chapel Hill, NC	53–97	0–2
November 14	Maryland Eastern Shore	No. 23 Creighton	CHI Health Center Omaha; Omaha, NE	45–84	0–3
November 23	Howard	No. 5 Duke	Cameron Indoor Stadium; Durham, NC	56–93	0–4
November 29	Norfolk State	No. 2 Arizona	McKale Memorial Center; Tucson, AZ	61–98	0–5
December 9	Maryland Eastern Shore	No. 24 Virginia	John Paul Jones Arena; Charlottesville, VA	60–84	0–6
December 30	South Carolina State	No. 19 Tennessee	Food City Center; Knoxville, TN	54–105	0–7

== Honors and awards ==
The MEAC announced its all-conference teams and major honors on March 11, 2026.

=== All-Conference awards and teams ===
Honor	Recipient
MEAC Men's Basketball Player of the Year	Bryce Harris, Howard
Coach of the Year	Kevin Broadus, Morgan State
Defensive Player of the Year	Cedric Taylor III, Howard
Sixth Man of the Year	Elijah Jamison, Norfolk State
Newcomer of the Year	Cedric Taylor III, Howard
Rookie of the Year	Noah Treadwell, South Carolina State
First Team
First Team	Bryce Harris, Howard
First Team	Gage Lattimore, North Carolina Central
First Team	Anthony McComb III, Norfolk State
First Team	Cedric Taylor III, Howard
First Team	Alfred Worrell Jr., Morgan State
Second Team
Second Team	Elijah Davis, Morgan State
Second Team	Ponce James, Delaware State
Second Team	Elijah Jamison, Norfolk State
Second Team	Jayden Johnson, South Carolina State
Second Team	Obanla Zion, Maryland Eastern Shore
Defense Team
Defense Team	Bryce Harris, Howard
Defense Team	Dionte Johnson, North Carolina Central
Defense Team	Ose Okojie, Howard
Defense Team	Kelechi Okworogwo, North Carolina Central
Defense Team	Cedric Taylor III, Howard
Rookie Team
Rookie Team	Noah Treadwell, South Carolina State
Rookie Team	My'kel Jenkins, Norfolk State
Rookie Team	Andrean Newton, Norfolk State
Rookie Team	Danas Kazakevicius, Howard
Rookie Team	Jalen St. Clair, Delaware State

== Postseason ==
=== Conference tournament ===
All 7 eligible teams qualify for the MEAC men's basketball tournament. The 2026 tournament was held at the Norfolk Scope in Norfolk, Virginia, from March 11 to 14, 2026. Howard received a first round bye as Coppin State was ineligible for postseason play due to Academic Progress Rate penalties and thus eliminated before the tournament began.

Quarterfinals; March 11–12; ESPN+
4	Norfolk State	82
5	South Carolina State	88
2	Morgan State	70
7	Delaware State	75*
3	North Carolina Central	83*
6	Maryland Eastern Shore	76

Semifinals; March 13; ESPN+
1	Howard	78
5	South Carolina State	61
7	Delaware State	53
3	North Carolina Central	59

Championship; March 14; ESPN2
1	Howard	70
3	North Carolina Central	63

* denotes overtime period

=== Postseason honors ===
Honor	Recipient	School
Tournament Outstanding Player	Bryce Harris	Howard
2026 Men’s Basketball All-Tournament team	Cam Gillus	Howard
2026 Men’s Basketball All-Tournament team	Dionte Johnson	NC Central
2026 Men’s Basketball All-Tournament team	Cedric Taylor III	Howard
2026 Men’s Basketball All-Tournament team	Gage Lattimore	NC Central
2026 Men’s Basketball All-Tournament team	Bryce Harris	Howard

=== NCAA Tournament ===
Seed	Region	School	First Four	First round	Second round	Sweet Sixteen	Elite Eight	Final Four	Championship
16	Midwest	Howard	W 86–83 vs. (16) UMBC	L 80–101 vs. (1) Michigan	DNP				
