= 2025–26 Coppin State Eagles men's basketball team =

American college basketball season

2025–26 Coppin State Eagles men's basketball
- Conference: Mid-Eastern Athletic Conference
- Record: 7–24 (5–9 MEAC)
- Head coach: Larry Stewart (3rd season)
- Assistant coaches: Sidney Raikes (3rd season); Stephen Stewart (3rd season)
- Home arena: Physical Education Complex

2025–26 MEAC men's basketball standings
	Conf.				Overall
Team	W		L	PCT	W		L	PCT
Howard	11	–	3	.786	21	–	10	.677
Morgan State	10	–	4	.714	14	–	15	.483
North Carolina Central	8	–	6	.571	12	–	17	.414
Norfolk State	8	–	6	.571	15	–	16	.484
South Carolina State	7	–	7	.500	9	–	21	.300
Maryland Eastern Shore	5	–	9	.357	9	–	22	.290
Coppin State*	5	–	9	.357	7	–	24	.226
Delaware State	2	–	12	.143	7	–	22	.241
† 2026 MEAC tournament winner * Ineligible for both the 2026 NCAA Tournament and MEAC tournament due to APR penalties. As of March 5, 2026

The 2025–26 Coppin State Eagles men's basketball team represented Coppin State University during the 2025–26 NCAA Division I men's basketball season. The Eagles, led by third-year head coach Larry Stewart, played their home games at the Physical Education Complex in Baltimore, Maryland as members of the Mid-Eastern Athletic Conference.

Coppin State was ineligible for the 2026 NCAA Tournament and the 2026 MEAC men's basketball tournament due to Academic Progress Rate penalties. They concluded the season with a 7–24 record while going 5–9 in MEAC play.

== Previous season ==
The Eagles finished the 2024–25 season 6–24, 4–10 in MEAC play to finish in seventh place. They were defeated by South Carolina State in the quarterfinals of the MEAC tournament.

== Offseason ==
=== Departures ===
Departures
Name	No.	Pos.	Height	Weight	Year	Hometown	Reason for departure
Zahree Harrison	0	G	6'0"	185	RS Senior	Philadelphia, PA	Completed eligibility
Ryan Archey	1	G	6'0"	170	Sophomore	Clinton, MD	Transferred to North Carolina Central
Toby Nnadozie	2	G	6'3"	185	Junior	Baltimore, MD	Transferred to Jacksonville State
Cam'Ron Brown	3	G	5'11"	185	Junior	Odenton, MD	Transferred to Northwestern Oklahoma State
Cam Liggins	5	G	6'5"	200	RS Sophomore	Springfield, MO	Transferred to Maryville
Julius Ellerbe III	6	G	6'7"	205	RS Senior	Washington, DC	Completed eligibility
Aa'reyon Munir-Jones	7	G	6'3"	185	Sophomore	Chicago, IL	Transferred to Florida Memorial
Derrius Ward	11	G	6'6"	205	RS Senior	Philadelphia, PA	Transferred to Grambling
Peter Oduro	12	F	6'8"	230	Junior	Gainesville, VA	Transferred to Hampton
Jonathan Dunn	13	F	6'7"	200	Sophomore	Florissant, MO	Transferred to North Carolina Central
Darius Leonard	20	G	6'1"	182	Junior	Washington, DC	Left team
Car'Ron Brown	21	G	6'1	185	Junior	Odenton, MD	Transferred to Central Baptist

=== Incoming transfers ===
Incoming transfers
Name	No.	Pos.	Height	Weight	Year	Hometown	Previous School
Baasil Saunders	0	G	6'4"	195	Junior	Philadelphia, PA	Montgomery County Community College
Hassan Perkins	1	G	6'0"	175	Senior	Wilmington, DE	Maryland Eastern Shore
Favour Aire	2	C	6'11"	220	Senior	Ekpoma, Nigeria	Bryant
Josiah Brown	3	G	6'5"	200	Sophomore	Baltimore, MD	Clinton Community College
Hussain Williams	4	G	6'5"	200	Junior	Lynchburg, VA	Community College of Baltimore County
DeMariontay Hall	6	F	6'7"	235	Senior	Atlanta, GA	Franklin Pierce
Torrin Andrews	11	G	6'4"	190	Senior	West Palm Beach, FL	Lander
Chris Morgan	12	F	6'9"	245	Senior	Grand Prairie, TX	Monmouth
Jamari Piercy	14	G	6'5"	170	Junior	Griffin, GA	Gordon State
Elijah Taylor	22	F	6'9"	230	Junior	Philadelphia, PA	Midland College
Taj Thweatt	24	F	6'7"	225	Senior	Wildwood, NJ	Fairmont State
Tyler Koenig	33	F	6'9"	225	Junior	Waldwick, NJ	Kutztown

=== Recruiting class ===
College recruiting information
Name	Hometown	School	Height	Weight	Commit date
Nelson Lamizana; F	West Chester, PA	Henderson High School	6 ft 9 in (2.06 m)	215 lb (98 kg)	
Nelson Lamizana; F	Recruit ratings: No ratings found				
Daveyon Lydner; G	York, PA	BeThe1 Academy	6 ft 4 in (1.93 m)	180 lb (82 kg)	
Daveyon Lydner; G	Recruit ratings: No ratings found				
Overall recruit ranking:
Note: In many cases, Scout, Rivals, 247Sports, On3, and ESPN may conflict in their listings of height and weight.; In these cases, the average was taken. ESPN grades are on a 100-point scale.; Sources: "2025 Coppin State Signees". ESPN.; "2025 Team Ranking". Rivals.

== Preseason ==
On October 8, 2025, the MEAC released its preseason poll. Coppin State was picked to finish last in the conference.

=== Preseason rankings ===
MEAC Preseason Poll
Place	Team	Votes
1	Norfolk State	118 (12)
2	Howard	97 (4)
3	South Carolina State	90
4	Morgan State	73
T–5	Delaware State	70
T–5	North Carolina Central	70
7	Maryland Eastern Shore	31
8	Coppin State	27
(#) first-place votes

=== Preseason All-MEAC Teams ===
Preseason All-MEAC Team
Team	Player	Year	Position
First	Khalil Horton	Junior	Forward
Second	Taj Thweatt	Senior	Forward

== Roster ==
2025–26 Coppin State Eagles men's basketball team
Players
Coaches

Pos.	#	Name	Height	Weight	Year	Previous school	Hometown
G	0	Baasil Saunders	6 ft 4 in (1.93 m)	195 lb (88 kg)	RS Jr	Montgomery County CC (PA)	Philadelphia, PA
G	1	Hassan Perkins	6 ft 0 in (1.83 m)	175 lb (79 kg)	Sr	Maryland Eastern Shore	Wilmington, DE
C	2	Favour Aire	6 ft 11 in (2.11 m)	220 lb (100 kg)	Sr	Bryant	Ekpoma, Nigeria
G	3	Josiah Brown	6 ft 5 in (1.96 m)	200 lb (91 kg)	So	Clinton CC (NY)	Baltimore, MD
G	4	Hussain Williams	6 ft 5 in (1.96 m)	200 lb (91 kg)	Jr	CC of Baltimore County (MD)	Lynchburg, VA
F	6	DeMariontay Hall	6 ft 7 in (2.01 m)	235 lb (107 kg)	Sr	Franklin Pierce	Atlanta, GA
F	7	Khali Horton	6 ft 8 in (2.03 m)	200 lb (91 kg)	Jr	Keystone Academy (PA)	Erie, PA
G	10	Camaren Sparrow	6 ft 4 in (1.93 m)	185 lb (84 kg)	Jr	New Town High School	Baltimore, MD
G	11	Torrin Andrews	6 ft 4 in (1.93 m)	190 lb (86 kg)	Sr	Lander	West Palm Beach, FL
F	12	Chris Morgan	6 ft 9 in (2.06 m)	245 lb (111 kg)	Sr	Monmouth	Grand Prairie, TX
F	14	Jamari Piercy	6 ft 5 in (1.96 m)	170 lb (77 kg)	Jr	Gordon State	Griffin, GA
G	15	Macahi Nelson	6 ft 5 in (1.96 m)	185 lb (84 kg)	Sr	American International	Hagerstown, MD
F	21	Nelson Lamizana	6 ft 9 in (2.06 m)	215 lb (98 kg)	Fr	Henderson High School	West Chester, PA
F	22	Elijah Taylor	6 ft 9 in (2.06 m)	230 lb (104 kg)	Jr	Midland College	Philadelphia, PA
G	23	Daveyon Lydner	6 ft 4 in (1.93 m)	180 lb (82 kg)	Fr	BeThe1 Academy (VA)	York, PA
F	24	Taj Thweatt	6 ft 7 in (2.01 m)	225 lb (102 kg)	Sr	Fairmont State	Wildwood, NJ
F	33	Tyler Koenig	6 ft 9 in (2.06 m)	225 lb (102 kg)	Jr	Kutztown	Waldwick, NJ

Head coach

- Larry Stewart (Coppin State)

Assistant coach(es)

- Sidney Raikes (Coppin State)
- Stephen Stewart (Coppin State)

Legend

- (C) Team captain
- (S) Suspended
- (I) Ineligible
- (W) Walk-on
- Injured
- Current redshirt

Roster
Last update: November 17, 2025

== Schedule and results ==
Date time, TV	Rank^{#}	Opponent^{#}	Result	Record	Site (attendance) city, state
Non-conference regular season
November 3, 2025*; 6:30 pm, BTN		vs. Maryland; Naismith Hall of Fame Series Baltimore	L 61–83	0–1	CFG Bank Arena; Baltimore, MD
November 5, 2025*; 6:30 pm, ESPN+		at La Salle	L 59–87	0–2	John Glaser Arena (1,587); Philadelphia, PA
November 9, 2025*; 1:00 pm, ESPN+		at James Madison	L 70–84	0–3	Atlantic Union Bank Center (2,665); Harrisonburg, VA
November 12, 2025*; 7:00 pm, ESPN+		at South Florida	L 50–100	0–4	Yuengling Center (3,208); Tampa, FL
November 14, 2025*; 11:00 am, YouTube		vs. Central Michigan; Showdown in St. Pete	L 59–82	0–5	McArthur Center (142); St. Petersburg, FL
November 15, 2025*; 11:00 am, YouTube		vs. South Alabama; Showdown in St. Pete	L 62–72	0–6	McArthur Center (243); St. Petersburg, FL
November 18, 2025*; 11:00 am, ESPN+		Central Penn	W 103–62	1–6	Physical Education Complex (2,928); Baltimore, MD
November 22, 2025*; 7:30 pm, MASN/ESPN+		at VCU	L 58–101	1–7	Siegel Center (7,242); Richmond, VA
November 25, 2025*; 7:00 pm, ESPN+		at Rider	W 68–65	2–7	Alumni Gymnasium (822); Lawrenceville, NJ
November 30, 2025*; 6:00 pm, ESPN+		at Loyola (MD)	L 84–95	2–8	Reitz Arena (517); Baltimore, MD
December 3, 2025*; 7:00 pm, ESPN+		at West Virginia	L 49–91	2–9	Hope Coliseum (9,713); Morgantown, WV
December 6, 2025*; 2:00 pm, ESPN+		at Liberty	L 50–92	2–10	Liberty Arena (2,878); Lynchburg, VA
December 9, 2025*; 7:00 pm, ESPN+		at Saint Joseph's	L 65–87	2–11	Hagan Arena (1,694); Philadelphia, PA
December 14, 2025*; 2:30 pm, ESPN+		at Radford	L 77–107	2–12	Dedmon Center (861); Radford, VA
December 19, 2025*; 5:00 pm, ESPN+		at Navy	L 55–88	2–13	Alumni Hall (724); Annapolis, MD
December 22, 2025*; 6:30 pm, ESPN+		at Georgetown	L 67–97	2–14	McDonough Arena (1,463); Washington, D.C.
December 29, 2025*; 6:00 pm, ESPN+		UMBC	L 59–93	2–15	Physical Education Complex (379); Baltimore, MD
MEAC regular season
January 3, 2026; 4:30 pm, ESPN+		at Delaware State	W 53–51	3–15 (1-0)	Memorial Hall (300); Dover, DE
January 10, 2026; 4:30 pm, ESPN+		North Carolina Central	L 77–88	3–16 (1–1)	Physical Education Complex (463); Baltimore, MD
January 12, 2026; 7:00 pm, ESPN+		South Carolina State	L 72–74	3–17 (1–2)	Physical Education Complex (166); Baltimore, MD
January 17, 2026; 4:30 pm, Delmarva SN		at Maryland Eastern Shore	L 67–70	3–18 (1–3)	Hytche Athletic Center (676); Princess Anne, MD
January 24, 2026*; 4:30 pm, ESPN+		at Norfolk State	L 76–103	3–19 (1–4)	Echols Hall (1,483); Norfolk, VA
January 31, 2026; 4:30 pm, ESPN+		Morgan State	L 80−89	3−20 (1−5)	Physical Education Complex (1,396); Baltimore, MD
February 2, 2026; 6:00 pm, ESPN+		Howard; Rescheduled from Jan. 26	L 53−72	3−21 (1−6)	Physical Education Complex (412); Baltimore, MD
February 7, 2026; 4:30 pm, ESPN+		Delaware State	W 65–47	4–21 (2–6)	Physical Education Complex (576); Baltimore, MD
February 14, 2026; 4:30 pm, ESPN+		at North Carolina Central	W 58−56	5−21 (3−6)	McDougald–McLendon Arena (2,731); Durham, NC
February 16, 2026; 7:00 pm, ESPN+		at South Carolina State	W 59−57	6−21 (4−6)	SHM Memorial Center (200); Orangeburg, SC
February 21, 2026; 4:30 pm, ESPN+		Maryland Eastern Shore	W 71−65 ^{OT}	7−21 (5−6)	Physical Education Complex (1,890); Baltimore, MD
February 28, 2026; 4:30 pm, ESPN+		Norfolk State	L 69–75	7–22 (5–7)	Physical Education Complex (428); Baltimore, MD
March 2, 2026; 7:00 pm, ESPN+		at Howard	L 70−90	7−23 (5−8)	Burr Gymnasium (1,281); Washington, DC
March 5, 2026; 8:00 pm, ESPN+		at Morgan State	L 66–70	7−24 (5−9)	Hill Field House (3,071); Baltimore, MD
*Non-conference game. ^{#}Rankings from AP Poll. (#) Tournament seedings in parentheses. All times are in Eastern.
