= 2025–26 Howard Bison men's basketball team =

American college basketball season

2025–26 Howard Bison men's basketball

MEAC regular season and tournament champions

NCAA tournament, First round
- Conference: Mid-Eastern Athletic Conference
- Record: 24–11 (11–3 MEAC)
- Head coach: Kenny Blakeney (7th season)
- Associate head coach: Rod Balanis; Nate James
- Assistant coaches: Tramel Raggs; Thomas Weaver
- Home arena: Burr Gymnasium

2025–26 MEAC men's basketball standings
	Conf.				Overall
Team	W		L	PCT	W		L	PCT
Howard †	11	–	3	.786	24	–	11	.686
Morgan State	10	–	4	.714	14	–	16	.467
North Carolina Central	8	–	6	.571	14	–	18	.438
Norfolk State	8	–	6	.571	15	–	17	.469
South Carolina State	7	–	7	.500	10	–	22	.313
Maryland Eastern Shore	5	–	9	.357	9	–	23	.281
Coppin State*	5	–	9	.357	7	–	24	.226
Delaware State	2	–	12	.143	8	–	23	.258
† 2026 MEAC tournament winner * Ineligible for both the 2026 NCAA Tournament and MEAC tournament due to APR penalties.

The 2025–26 Howard Bison men's basketball team represented Howard University during the 2025–26 NCAA Division I men's basketball season. The Bison, led by seventh-year head coach Kenny Blakeney, played their home games at Burr Gymnasium in Washington, D.C. as members of the Mid-Eastern Athletic Conference (MEAC).

== Previous season ==
The Bison finished the 2024–25 season 12–20, 7–7 in MEAC play, to finish in a tie for fourth place. They were defeated by Morgan State in the quarterfinals of the MEAC tournament.

== Preseason ==
On October 8, 2025, the MEAC released their preseason polls. Howard was picked to finish second in the conference, while receiving four first-place votes.

=== Preseason rankings ===
MEAC Preseason Poll
Place	Team	Votes
1	Norfolk State	118 (12)
2	Howard	97 (4)
3	South Carolina State	90
4	Morgan State	73
T–5	Delaware State	70
T–5	North Carolina Central	70
7	Maryland Eastern Shore	31
8	Coppin State	27
(#) first-place votes

=== Preseason All-MEAC teams ===
Preseason All-MEAC team
Team	Player	Year	Position
First	Bryce Harris	Graduate senior	Guard
Second	Cam Gillus	Junior	Guard
Third	Cedric Taylor III	Junior	Guard

== Roster ==
2025–26 Howard Bison men's basketball team
Players
Coaches

Pos.	#	Name	Height	Weight	Year	Previous school	Hometown
G	0	Isaiah Brown	6 ft 1 in (1.85 m)	170 lb (77 kg)	RS Fr	Don Bosco Prep	Ramsey, NJ
F	1	Stefan Isailovic	6 ft 8 in (2.03 m)	—	Fr	KK Partizan U18	Belgrade, Serbia
G	2	Cam Gillus	5 ft 11 in (1.8 m)	180 lb (82 kg)	Jr	Lehigh	Falls Church, VA
G	3	BJ Powell	6 ft 0 in (1.83 m)	—	Fr	Combine Academy	Charlotte, NC
G	4	Alex Cotton	6 ft 5 in (1.96 m)	200 lb (91 kg)	Jr	North Texas	Carrollton, TX
G	5	Shane Frazier	6 ft 5 in (1.96 m)	—	Fr	Brentwood School	Los Angeles, CA
F	7	Julian Johnson	6 ft 9 in (2.06 m)	—	Fr	Providence Day School	Charlotte, NC
G	9	River Smith	5 ft 10 in (1.78 m)	—	Fr	Englewood HS	Englewood, NJ
G	10	Jeremiah Johnson	6 ft 3 in (1.91 m)	—	Fr	Bullis School	Potomac, MD
G	11	Ose Okojie	6 ft 5 in (1.96 m)	191 lb (87 kg)	Jr	United Scholastic Academy	Brampton, ON
G	12	Cedric Taylor III	6 ft 7 in (2.01 m)	210 lb (95 kg)	Jr	Morehouse College	Atlanta, GA
C	13	Danas Kazakevicius	6 ft 10 in (2.08 m)	—	Fr	Telekom Baskets Bonn	Vilnius, Lithuania
F	21	Calvin Robins Jr.	6 ft 5 in (1.96 m)	185 lb (84 kg)	So	Kenwood Academy	Chicago, IL
G	23	Ed Holland III	6 ft 6 in (1.98 m)	210 lb (95 kg)	RS Sr	Penn	Philadelphia, PA
F	32	Travelle Bryson	6 ft 5 in (1.96 m)	185 lb (84 kg)	So	Vincennes	Anderson, SC
G	34	Bryce Harris	6 ft 4 in (1.93 m)	220 lb (100 kg)	GS	Putnam Science Academy	Brentwood, NY

Head coach

- Kenny Blakeney (Duke)

Assistant coach(es)

- Rod Balanis (Georgia Tech)
- Nate James (Duke)
- Tramel Raggs (Missouri)
- Thomas Weaver (Howard)

Legend

- (C) Team captain
- (S) Suspended
- (I) Ineligible
- (W) Walk-on
- Injured
- Current redshirt

Roster
Last update: December 9, 2025

== Schedule and results ==
Date time, TV	Rank^{#}	Opponent^{#}	Result	Record	Site (attendance) city, state
Exhibition
October 28, 2025*; 7:00 p.m.		American	W 77–63		Burr Gymnasium; Washington, D.C.
Regular season
November 3, 2025*; 7:00 p.m., ESPN+		Missouri	L 67–88	0–1	Burr Gymnasium (2,312); Washington, D.C.
November 6, 2025*; 7:00 p.m., ESPN+		District of Columbia	W 103–71	1–1	Burr Gymnasium (1,162); Washington, D.C.
November 9, 2025*; 6:00 p.m., ESPN+		Grambling State	L 70–73	1–2	Burr Gymnasium (1,653); Washington, D.C.
November 13, 2025*; 7:00 p.m., ESPN+		Alcorn State	W 72–64	2–2	Burr Gymnasium (1,891); Washington, D.C.
November 19, 2025*; 7:00 p.m., ESPN+		at Stetson	L 60–64	2–3	Edmunds Center (630); DeLand, FL
November 22, 2025*; 4:00 p.m., ACCNX		vs. Niagara; The Brotherhood Run	W 80–70	3–3	Cameron Indoor Stadium; Durham, NC
November 23, 2025*; 4:00 p.m., ACCN		at No. 5 Duke; The Brotherhood Run	L 56–93	3–4	Cameron Indoor Stadium (9,314); Durham, NC
November 26, 2025*; 4:00 p.m., ESPN+		St. Mary's (MD)	W 115–61	4–4	Burr Gymnasium (396); Washington, D.C.
November 29, 2025*; 4:00 p.m., ESPN+		at Mount St. Mary's	L 75–79	4–5	Knott Arena (1,407); Emmitsburg, MD
December 6, 2025*; 6:00 p.m., ESPN+		Bowie State	W 85–69	5–5	Burr Gymnasium (871); Washington, D.C.
December 9, 2025*; 7:00 p.m., HBCU GO		vs. North Carolina A&T	W 73–69	6–5	Cameron Indoor Stadium (780); Durham, NC
December 13, 2025*; 3:00 p.m., ESPN+		vs. Hampton; Battle of the Real HU	W 61–57	7–5	CareFirst Arena; Washington, D.C.
December 16, 2025*; 11:00 a.m., FloSports		at Drexel	W 74–66	8–5	Daskalakis Athletic Center (1,954); Philadelphia, PA
December 20, 2025*; 2:00 p.m., FloSports		at UNC Wilmington	W 67–66	9–5	Trask Coliseum (5,220); Wilmington, NC
December 30, 2025*; 4:00 p.m., BTN		at Northwestern	L 60–80	9–6	Welsh–Ryan Arena (4,992); Evanston, IL
January 3, 2026; 4:00 p.m.		at South Carolina State	L 57–58	9–7 (0–1)	SHM Memorial Center (425); Orangeburg, SC
January 10, 2026; 4:30 p.m.		at Maryland Eastern Shore	L 57–59	9–8 (0–2)	Hytche Athletic Center (1,000); Princess Anne, MD
January 12, 2026; 7:00 p.m., ESPN+		Delaware State	W 84–58	10–8 (1–2)	Burr Gymnasium (2,184); Washington, D.C.
January 17, 2026; 4:30 p.m., ESPN+		at North Carolina Central	W 83–69	11–8 (2–2)	McDougald–McLendon Arena (2,318); Durham, NC
January 19, 2026*; 4:00 p.m., ESPN+		Morehouse; MLK Day Classic	W 78–69	12–8	Burr Gymnasium (2,696); Washington, D.C.
January 24, 2026; 2:00 p.m., ESPN+		Morgan State	L 77–78	12–9 (2–3)	Burr Gymnasium; Washington, D.C.
January 31, 2026; 4:00 p.m., ESPNU		Norfolk State	W 88–60	13–9 (3–3)	Burr Gymnasium (1,848); Washington, D.C.
February 2, 2026; 6:00 p.m.		at Coppin State; Rescheduled from Jan. 26	W 72–53	14–9 (4–3)	Physical Education Complex (412); Baltimore, MD
February 7, 2026; 4:00 p.m.		South Carolina State	W 85–57	15–9 (5–3)	Burr Gymnasium (1,228); Washington, D.C.
February 9, 2026*; 7:00 p.m., ESPN+		Yale	L 81–87 ^{OT}	15–10	Burr Gymnasium (2,381); Washington, D.C.
February 14, 2026; 4:00 p.m., ESPN+		Maryland Eastern Shore	W 79–53	16–10 (6–3)	Burr Gymnasium (1,257); Washington, D.C.
February 16, 2026; 7:00 p.m., ESPN+		at Delaware State	W 91–59	17–10 (7–3)	Memorial Hall (663); Dover, DE
February 21, 2026; 4:00 p.m., ESPN+		North Carolina Central	W 100–67	18–10 (8–3)	Burr Gymnasium; Washington, D.C.
February 28, 2026; 4:00 p.m., ESPN+		at Morgan State	W 84–59	19–10 (9–3)	Hill Field House (3,237); Baltimore, MD
March 2, 2026; 7:00 p.m., ESPN+		Coppin State	W 90–70	20–10 (10–3)	Burr Gymnasium (1,281); Washington, D.C.
March 5, 2026; 7:00 p.m., ESPN+		at Norfolk State	W 84–76	21–10 (11–3)	Echols Hall (4,165); Norfolk, VA
MEAC tournament
March 13, 2026; 6:00 pm, ESPN+	(1)	vs. (5) South Carolina State; Semifinal	W 78–61	22–10	Norfolk Scope; Norfolk, VA
March 13, 2026; 1:00 pm, ESPN2	(1)	vs. (3) North Carolina Central; Championship	W 70–63	23–10	Norfolk Scope; Norfolk, VA
NCAA tournament
March 17, 2026; 6:40 p.m., truTV	(16 MW)	vs. (16 MW) UMBC; First Four	W 86–83	24–10	UD Arena (11,756); Dayton, OH
March 19, 2026; 7:30 p.m., CBS	(16 MW)	vs. (1 MW) No. 3 Michigan; First round	L 80–101	24–11	KeyBank Center; Buffalo, NY
*Non-conference game. ^{#}Rankings from AP poll. (#) Tournament seedings in parentheses. MW=Midwest. All times are in Eastern.
