= 2025–26 North Carolina Central Eagles men's basketball team =

American college basketball season

2025–26 North Carolina Central Eagles men's basketball
- Conference: Mid-Eastern Athletic Conference
- Record: 14–18 (8–6 MEAC)
- Head coach: LeVelle Moton (17th season)
- Assistant coaches: Reggie Sharp; Nigel Thomas; Wes Pifer
- Home arena: McDougald–McLendon Arena

2025–26 MEAC men's basketball standings
	Conf.				Overall
Team	W		L	PCT	W		L	PCT
Howard †	11	–	3	.786	24	–	11	.686
Morgan State	10	–	4	.714	14	–	16	.467
North Carolina Central	8	–	6	.571	14	–	18	.438
Norfolk State	8	–	6	.571	15	–	17	.469
South Carolina State	7	–	7	.500	10	–	22	.313
Maryland Eastern Shore	5	–	9	.357	9	–	23	.281
Coppin State*	5	–	9	.357	7	–	24	.226
Delaware State	2	–	12	.143	8	–	23	.258
† 2026 MEAC tournament winner * Ineligible for both the 2026 NCAA Tournament and MEAC tournament due to APR penalties.

The 2025–26 North Carolina Central Eagles men's basketball team represented North Carolina Central University during the 2025–26 NCAA Division I men's basketball season. The Eagles, led by 17th-year head coach LeVelle Moton, played their home games at McDougald–McLendon Arena in Durham, North Carolina as members of the Mid-Eastern Athletic Conference (MEAC).

== Previous season ==
The Eagles finished the 2024–25 season 14–19, 6–8 in MEAC play, to finish in sixth place. In the MEAC tournament, they defeated Delaware State in the quarterfinals before falling to South Carolina State in the semifinals.

== Preseason ==
On October 8, 2025, the MEAC released their preseason polls. North Carolina Central was picked to finish fifth in the conference.

=== Preseason rankings ===
MEAC Preseason Poll
Place	Team	Votes
1	Norfolk State	118 (12)
2	Howard	97 (4)
3	South Carolina State	90
4	Morgan State	73
T–5	Delaware State	70
T–5	North Carolina Central	70
7	Maryland Eastern Shore	31
8	Coppin State	27
(#) first-place votes

=== Preseason All-MEAC Teams ===
Preseason All-MEAC Team
Team	Player	Year	Position
Second	Dionte Johnson	Senior	Guard

== Roster ==
2025–26 North Carolina Central Eagles men's basketball team
Players
Coaches

Pos.	#	Name	Height	Weight	Year	Previous school	Hometown
G	1	Kyric Davis	6 ft 5 in (1.96 m)	202 lb (92 kg)	Sr	West Georgia	Americus, GA
G	2	Dionte Johnson	6 ft 0 in (1.83 m)	200 lb (91 kg)	Sr	Maryland Eastern Shore	Bronx, NY
G	3	Khalil Arnold	6 ft 4 in (1.93 m)	180 lb (82 kg)	Jr	Hutchinson CC	Simpsonville, SC
G	4	Camren Daniels	6 ft 5 in (1.96 m)	185 lb (84 kg)	RS Fr	Southern Durham HS	Durham, NC
G	5	Tekao Carpenter	6 ft 3 in (1.91 m)	190 lb (86 kg)	Sr	Austin Peay	Alexandria, VA
F	7	Khouri Carvey	6 ft 9 in (2.06 m)	232 lb (105 kg)	Sr	Morehead State	Wilson, NC
G	8	Jae Slack	6 ft 6 in (1.98 m)	210 lb (95 kg)	RS Sr	West Virginia State	Fort Worth, TX
F	9	Gbenga Olubi	6 ft 7 in (2.01 m)	207 lb (94 kg)	GS	Utah State Eastern	Corona, CA
G	10	Ryan Archey	6 ft 0 in (1.83 m)	172 lb (78 kg)	RS So	Coppin State	Clinton, MD
G	11	Gage Lattimore	6 ft 2 in (1.88 m)	190 lb (86 kg)	So	Seton Hill	Greensboro, NC
G	12	Justin Edwards	5 ft 9 in (1.75 m)	170 lb (77 kg)	Sr	Harris–Stowe State	Corona, CA
F	13	Jonathan Dunn	6 ft 7 in (2.01 m)	208 lb (94 kg)	RS Jr	Coppin State	St. Louis, MO
F	21	Kelechi Okworogwo	6 ft 6 in (1.98 m)	220 lb (100 kg)	Sr	Maryland Eastern Shore	Bronx, NY
F	22	Ramondo Battle II	6 ft 8 in (2.03 m)	200 lb (91 kg)	Sr	Evansville	McKinney, TX

Head coach

- LeVelle Moton (North Carolina Central)

Assistant coach(es)

- Reggie Sharp (Auburn)
- Nigel Thomas (Langston)
- Wes Pifer (Penn State Altoona)

Legend

- (C) Team captain
- (S) Suspended
- (I) Ineligible
- (W) Walk-on
- Injured
- Current redshirt

Roster
Last update: December 12, 2025

== Schedule and results ==
Date time, TV	Rank^{#}	Opponent^{#}	Result	Record	Site (attendance) city, state
Regular season
November 3, 2025*; 7:00 p.m., ACCNX		at NC State	L 66–114	0–1	Lenovo Center (19,119); Raleigh, NC
November 7, 2025*; 7:00 p.m., ACCNX		at Virginia	L 62–81	0–2	John Paul Jones Arena (12,576); Charlottesville, VA
November 9, 2025*; 1:00 p.m., ESPN+		at Appalachian State	L 54–76	0–3	Holmes Convocation Center (1,487); Boone, NC
November 12, 2025*; 7:00 p.m., ESPN+		Bluefield State	W 72–64	1–3	McDougald–McLendon Arena (1,543); Durham, NC
November 14, 2025*; 9:00 p.m., ACCN		at No. 18 North Carolina	L 53–97	1–4	Dean Smith Center (17,522); Chapel Hill, NC
November 18, 2025*; 7:30 p.m., ESPN+		Toccoa Falls	W 123–67	2–4	McDougald–McLendon Arena (1,287); Durham, NC
November 22, 2025*; 2:00 p.m., ESPN+		at Dayton	L 55–74	2–5	UD Arena (13,407); Dayton, OH
November 25, 2025*; 7:00 p.m., ESPN+		at USC Upstate	L 67–82	2–6	G.B. Hodge Center (357); Spartanburg, SC
November 29, 2025*; 2:00 p.m.		Carolina	W 109–61	3–6	McDougald–McLendon Arena (176); Durham, NC
December 3, 2025*; 7:00 p.m., ESPN+		at James Madison	L 62–67	3–7	Atlantic Union Bank Center (2,492); Harrisonburg, VA
December 6, 2025*; 4:00 p.m., ESPN+		North Carolina A&T	L 54–69	3–8	McDougald–McLendon Arena (2,631); Durham, NC
December 9, 2025*; 7:00 p.m., SECN		at Kentucky	L 67–103	3–9	Rupp Arena (19,247); Lexington, KY
December 17, 2025*; 7:00 p.m.		Mid-Atlantic Christian	W 96–62	4–9	McDougald–McLendon Arena (165); Durham, NC
December 20, 2025*; 2:00 p.m.		Longwood	L 72–74	4–10	McDougald–McLendon Arena (391); Durham, NC
December 29, 2025*; 1:00 p.m., BTN		at Penn State	L 67–90	4–11	Bryce Jordan Center (5,285); University Park, PA
January 3, 2026; 4:30 p.m., ESPN+		Norfolk State	W 69–67	5–11 (1–0)	McDougald–McLendon Arena (1,054); Durham, NC
January 10, 2026; 4:30 p.m., ESPN+		at Coppin State	W 88–77	6–11 (2–0)	Physical Education Complex (463); Baltimore, MD
January 12, 2026; 6:00 p.m.		at Morgan State	W 89–78	7–11 (3–0)	Hill Field House (471); Baltimore, MD
January 17, 2026; 4:30 p.m., ESPN+		Howard	L 69–83	7–12 (3–1)	McDougald–McLendon Arena (2,318); Durham, NC
February 2, 2026; 7:00 p.m., ESPN+		Maryland Eastern Shore	W 65–63	8–12 (4–1)	McDougald–McLendon Arena (362); Durham, NC
February 7, 2026; 4:00 p.m.		at Norfolk State	L 68–75	8–13 (4–2)	Echols Hall (2,235); Norfolk, VA
February 9, 2026; 7:00 p.m., ESPN+		Delaware State; Rescheduled from Jan. 24	W 72–63	9–13 (5–2)	McDougald–McLendon Arena (1,742); Durham, NC
February 14, 2026; 4:30 p.m., ESPN+		Coppin State	L 56–58	9–14 (5–3)	McDougald–McLendon Arena (2,731); Durham, NC
February 16, 2026; 7:00 p.m., ESPN+		Morgan State	W 80–76	10–14 (6–3)	McDougald–McLendon Arena (1,554); Durham, NC
February 18, 2026; 7:00 p.m., ESPN+		at South Carolina State; Rescheduled from Jan. 31	L 72–85	10–15 (6–4)	SHM Memorial Center (350); Orangeburg, SC
February 21, 2026; 12:00 p.m., ESPN+		at Howard	L 67–100	10–16 (6–5)	Burr Gymnasium (ESPN+); Washington, D.C.
February 28, 2026; 4:00 p.m., ESPN+		at Delaware State	W 74–60	11–16 (7–5)	Memorial Hall (426); Dover, DE
March 2, 2026; 7:00 p.m.		at Maryland Eastern Shore	W 77–73	12–16 (8–5)	Hytche Athletic Center (888); Princess Anne, MD
March 5, 2026; 7:30 p.m., ESPNU		South Carolina State	L 64–80	12–17 (8–6)	McDougald–McLendon Arena (2,629); Durham, NC
MEAC tournament
March 12, 2026; 8:00 pm, ESPN+	(3)	vs. (6) Maryland Eastern Shore; Quarterfinals	W 83–76 ^{OT}	13–17	Norfolk Scope; Norfolk, VA
March 13, 2026; 8:00 pm, ESPN+	(3)	vs. (7) Delaware State; Semifinals	W 59–53	14–17	Norfolk Scope; Norfolk, VA
March 14, 2026; 1:00 pm, ESPN2	(3)	vs. (1) Howard; Championship	L 63–70	14–18	Norfolk Scope; Norfolk, VA
*Non-conference game. ^{#}Rankings from AP poll. (#) Tournament seedings in parentheses. All times are in Eastern.
