= 2025–26 Delaware State Hornets men's basketball team =

American college basketball season

2025–26 Delaware State Hornets men's basketball
- Conference: Mid-Eastern Athletic Conference
- Record: 8–23 (2–12 MEAC)
- Head coach: Stan Waterman (5th season)
- Assistant coaches: Horace Owens; Vernon Dupree Jr.; Shahid Perkins
- Home arena: Memorial Hall

2025–26 MEAC men's basketball standings
| | Conf. | | | | Overall |
| Team | W | | L | PCT | W | | L | PCT |
|---|---|---|---|---|---|---|---|---|
| Howard † | 11 | – | 3 | .786 | 23 | – | 10 | .697 |
| Morgan State | 10 | – | 4 | .714 | 14 | – | 16 | .467 |
| North Carolina Central | 8 | – | 6 | .571 | 14 | – | 18 | .438 |
| Norfolk State | 8 | – | 6 | .571 | 15 | – | 17 | .469 |
| South Carolina State | 7 | – | 7 | .500 | 10 | – | 22 | .313 |
| Maryland Eastern Shore | 5 | – | 9 | .357 | 9 | – | 23 | .281 |
| Coppin State* | 5 | – | 9 | .357 | 7 | – | 24 | .226 |
| Delaware State | 2 | – | 12 | .143 | 8 | – | 23 | .258 |
† 2026 MEAC tournament winner * Ineligible for both the 2026 NCAA Tournament and MEAC tournament due to APR penalties. As of March 14, 2026

The 2025–26 Delaware State Hornets men's basketball team represented Delaware State University during the 2025–26 NCAA Division I men's basketball season. The Hornets, led by fifth-year head coach Stan Waterman, played their home games at Memorial Hall in Dover, Delaware as members of the Mid-Eastern Athletic Conference.

== Previous season ==
The Hornets finished the 2024–25 season 16–14, 8–6 in MEAC play to finish in third place. They were upset in the quarterfinals of the MEAC tournament by No. 6-seeded NC Central.

== Preseason ==
On October 8, 2025, the MEAC released their preseason polls. Delaware State was picked to finish fifth in the conference.

=== Preseason rankings ===
MEAC Preseason Poll
| Place | Team | Votes |
|---|---|---|
| 1 | Norfolk State | 118 (12) |
| 2 | Howard | 97 (4) |
| 3 | South Carolina State | 90 |
| 4 | Morgan State | 73 |
| T–5 | Delaware State | 70 |
| T–5 | North Carolina Central | 70 |
| 7 | Maryland Eastern Shore | 31 |
| 8 | Coppin State | 27 |
(#) first-place votes

=== Preseason All-MEAC Teams ===
Preseason All-MEAC Team
| Team | Player | Year | Position |
|---|---|---|---|
| First | Ponce James | Sophomore | Guard |
| Second | Zion Bethea | Graduate Senior | Guard |
| Second | Camian Shell | Graduate Senior | Guard |

== Roster ==
2025–26 Delaware State Hornets men's basketball team
Players
Coaches

| Pos. | # | Name | Height | Weight | Year | Previous school | Hometown |
|---|---|---|---|---|---|---|---|
| G | 0 | Rahmir Moore | 6 ft 3 in (1.91 m) | 205 lb (93 kg) | GS | Wagner | Philadelphia, PA |
| G | 1 | Ponce James | 5 ft 11 in (1.8 m) | 180 lb (82 kg) | So | Bridgeport Prep | Bridgeport, CT |
| G | 2 | Corey Perkins | 6 ft 2 in (1.88 m) | 180 lb (82 kg) | GS | Sanford School | Wilmington, DE |
| F | 3 | Miles Webb | 6 ft 8 in (2.03 m) | 190 lb (86 kg) | Sr | St. Francis | Arlington, VA |
| G | 4 | Zion Bethea | 6 ft 4 in (1.93 m) | 205 lb (93 kg) | GS | Pepperdine | South Orange, NJ |
| G | 5 | John Clemmons | 6 ft 6 in (1.98 m) | 203 lb (92 kg) | So | Caravel Academy | Bear, DE |
| G | 8 | Jalen St Clair | 6 ft 1 in (1.85 m) | 165 lb (75 kg) | Fr | Coronado HS | Bethesda, MD |
| C | 10 | Cyril Obasogie | 6 ft 11 in (2.11 m) | 211 lb (96 kg) | Jr | Harcum | Edo State, Nigeria |
| G | 11 | Camian Shell (S) | 5 ft 10 in (1.78 m) | 170 lb (77 kg) | GS | NC A&T | Winston-Salem, NC |
| F | 13 | Kareem Watson | 6 ft 9 in (2.06 m) | 180 lb (82 kg) | So | West Catholic HS | Philadelphia, PA |
| G | 22 | Dean Shepherd | 6 ft 3 in (1.91 m) | 180 lb (82 kg) | Jr | Tower Hill School | New Castle, DE |
| F | 24 | Omari Stephen | 6 ft 4 in (1.93 m) | — | GS | Niagara County CC | Brooklyn, NY |
| C | 35 | Muazibini Adamu | 6 ft 10 in (2.08 m) | 215 lb (98 kg) | Jr | Harcum | Accra, Ghana |
| F | 37 | Ademar Santos | 6 ft 8 in (2.03 m) | 201 lb (91 kg) | Jr | Harcum | Stockholm, Sweden |
| F | 42 | Bessanty Saragba | 6 ft 9 in (2.06 m) | 215 lb (98 kg) | Sr | Texas State | Marseille, France |

Head coach

- Stan Waterman (Delaware)

Assistant coach(es)

- Horace Owens (Rhode Island)
- Vernon Dupree Jr. (Wilmington)
- Shahid Perkins (East Tennessee State)

Legend

- (C) Team captain
- (S) Suspended
- (I) Ineligible
- (W) Walk-on
- Injured
- Current redshirt

Roster
Last update: December 5, 2025

== Schedule and results ==
| Date time, TV | Rank^{#} | Opponent^{#} | Result | Record | Site (attendance) city, state |
Exhibition
| November 1, 2025*; 2:00 pm | | Delaware Valley | W 87–62 | – | Memorial Hall; Dover, DE |
Non-conference regular season
| November 5, 2025*; 7:00 pm, ESPN+ | | at Temple | L 65–83 | 0–1 | Liacouras Center (3,637); Philadelphia, PA |
| November 8, 2025*; 1:00 pm, ACCNX | | at Syracuse | L 43–83 | 0–2 | JMA Wireless Dome (19,275); Syracuse, NY |
| November 10, 2025*; 6:30 pm, ESPN+ | | at Niagara | L 57–68 | 0–3 | Gallagher Center (1,676); Lewiston, NY |
| November 15, 2025*; 1:00 pm, NECFR | | at New Haven | L 52–65 | 0–4 | Hazell Center (673); West Haven, CT |
| November 18, 2025*; 7:00 pm, ESPN+ | | Cheyney | W 88–70 | 1–4 | Memorial Hall (300); Dover, DE |
| November 20, 2025*; 7:00 pm, ESPN+ | | Kean | W 66–64 | 2–4 | Memorial Hall (500); Dover, DE |
| November 23, 2025*; 1:00 pm, ACCNX | | at Miami (FL) | L 41–97 | 2–5 | Watsco Center (4,126); Coral Gables, FL |
| November 26, 2025*; 2:30 pm | | vs. Virginia State; HBCU in DC Tip-off Experience | L 58–62 | 2–6 | CareFirst Arena (1,000); Washington, D.C. |
| November 29, 2025*; 2:00 pm, ESPN+ | | at UMBC | L 57–71 | 2–7 | Chesapeake Arena (723); Catonsville, MD |
| December 3, 2025*; 7:00 pm, ESPN+ | | Navy | L 59–66 | 2–8 | Memorial Hall (300); Dover, DE |
| December 6, 2025*; 2:00 pm, ESPN+ | | Delaware; Rivalry | W 75–72 ^{OT} | 3–8 | Memorial Hall (400); Dover, DE |
| December 13, 2025*; 3:00 pm, ESPN+ | | at Longwood | W 81–76 | 4–8 | Joan Perry Brock Center (1,294); Farmville, VA |
| December 18, 2025*; 7:00 pm, ESPN+ | | at Saint Joseph's | L 51–67 | 4–9 | Hagan Arena (1,503); Philadelphia, PA |
| December 21, 2025*; 2:00 pm, ESPN+ | | Holy Family | W 73–61 | 5–9 | Memorial Hall (300); Dover, DE |
| December 29, 2025*; 7:00 pm, BTN | | at Rutgers | L 50–65 | 5–10 | Jersey Mike's Arena (8,000); Piscataway, NJ |
MEAC regular season
| January 3, 2026; 4:00 pm, ESPN+ | | Coppin State | L 51–53 | 5–11 (0–1) | Memorial Hall (300); Dover, DE |
| January 10, 2026; 4:00 pm, ESPN+ | | Norfolk State | L 64–66 | 5–12 (0–2) | Memorial Hall (500); Dover, DE |
| January 12, 2026; 7:00 pm | | at Howard | L 58–84 | 5–13 (0–3) | Burr Gymnasium (2,184); Washington, D.C. |
| January 17, 2026; 4:00 pm, ESPN+ | | Morgan State | L 79–80 | 5–14 (0–4) | Memorial Hall (374); Dover, DE |
| January 26, 2026; 7:30 pm | | at South Carolina State | L 64–70 | 5–15 (0–5) | SHM Memorial Center (325); Orangeburg, SC |
| January 31, 2026; 4:30 pm, ESPN+ | | Maryland Eastern Shore | W 65–57 | 6–15 (1–5) | Memorial Hall (483); Dover, DE |
| February 7, 2026; 4:30 pm, ESPN+ | | at Coppin State | L 47–65 | 6–16 (1–6) | Physical Education Complex (576); Baltimore, MD |
| February 9, 2026; 8:00 pm | | at North Carolina Central; Rescheduled from Jan. 24 | L 63–72 | 6–17 (1–7) | McDougald–McLendon Arena (1,742); Durham, NC |
| February 14, 2026; 4:30 pm, ESPN+ | | at Norfolk State | L 58–75 | 6–18 (1–8) | Joseph G. Echols Memorial Hall (2,431); Norfolk, VA |
| February 16, 2026; 7:00 pm, ESPN+ | | Howard | L 59–91 | 6–19 (1–9) | Memorial Hall (633); Dover, DE |
| February 21, 2026; 4:00 pm | | at Morgan State | L 68–82 | 6–20 (1–10) | Hill Field House (1,478); Baltimore, MD |
| February 28, 2026; 4:30 pm, ESPN+ | | North Carolina Central | L 60–74 | 6–21 (1–11) | Memorial Hall (426); Dover, DE |
| March 2, 2026; 7:00 pm, ESPN+ | | South Carolina State | L 59–61 | 6–22 (1–12) | Memorial Hall (153); Dover, DE |
| March 5, 2026; 7:00 pm | | at Maryland Eastern Shore | W 57–56 | 7–22 (2–12) | Hytche Athletic Center (2,026); Princess Anne, MD |
MEAC tournament
| March 11, 2026; 6:00 pm, ESPN+ | (7) | vs. (2) Morgan State; Quarterfinals | W 75–70 ^{OT} | 8–22 | Norfolk Scope; Norfolk, VA |
| March 13, 2026; 8:00 pm, ESPN+ | (7) | vs. (3) North Carolina Central; Semifinals | L 53–59 | 8–23 | Norfolk Scope; Norfolk, VA |
*Non-conference game. ^{#}Rankings from AP Poll. (#) Tournament seedings in parentheses. All times are in Eastern.
