= 2025–26 Maryland Eastern Shore Hawks men's basketball team =

American college basketball season

2025–26 Maryland Eastern Shore Hawks men's basketball
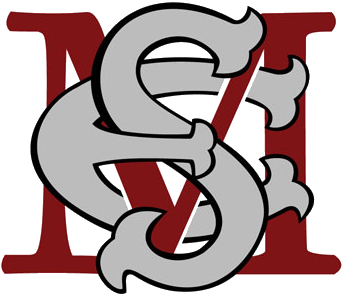
- Conference: Mid-Eastern Athletic Conference
- Record: 9–23 (5–9 MEAC)
- Head coach: Cleo Hill Jr. (2nd season)
- Assistant coaches: Lance Beckwith; Chuck Ellis; Delorian Heard
- Home arena: Hytche Athletic Center

2025–26 MEAC men's basketball standings
	Conf.				Overall
Team	W		L	PCT	W		L	PCT
Howard	11	–	3	.786	21	–	10	.677
Morgan State	10	–	4	.714	14	–	16	.467
North Carolina Central	8	–	6	.571	13	–	17	.433
Norfolk State	8	–	6	.571	15	–	17	.469
South Carolina State	7	–	7	.500	10	–	21	.323
Maryland Eastern Shore	5	–	9	.357	9	–	23	.281
Coppin State*	5	–	9	.357	7	–	24	.226
Delaware State	2	–	12	.143	8	–	22	.267
† 2026 MEAC tournament winner * Ineligible for both the 2026 NCAA Tournament and MEAC tournament due to APR penalties. As of March 12, 2026

The 2025–26 Maryland Eastern Shore Hawks men's basketball team represented the University of Maryland Eastern Shore during the 2025–26 NCAA Division I men's basketball season. The Hawks, led by second-year head coach Cleo Hill Jr., played their home games at the Hytche Athletic Center in Princess Anne, Maryland as members of the Mid-Eastern Athletic Conference.

== Previous season ==
The Hawks finished the 2024–25 season 6–25, 2–12 in MEAC play, to finish in eighth place. They were defeated by Norfolk State in the quarterfinals of the MEAC tournament.

== Preseason ==
On October 8, 2025, the MEAC released their preseason polls. Maryland Eastern Shore was picked to finish seventh in the conference.

=== Preseason rankings ===
MEAC Preseason Poll
Place	Team	Votes
1	Norfolk State	118 (12)
2	Howard	97 (4)
3	South Carolina State	90
4	Morgan State	73
T–5	Delaware State	70
T–5	North Carolina Central	70
7	Maryland Eastern Shore	31
8	Coppin State	27
(#) first-place votes

=== Preseason All-MEAC Teams ===
Preseason All-MEAC Team
Team	Player	Year	Position
First	Chris Flippin	Senior	Forward
Third	Michael Teal	Freshman	Guard

== Roster ==
2025–26 Maryland Eastern Shore Hawks men's basketball team
Players
Coaches

Pos.	#	Name	Height	Weight	Year	Previous school	Hometown
G	0	Jaden Cooper	6 ft 3 in (1.91 m)	190 lb (86 kg)	GS	Columbia	Goldsboro, NC
G/F	1	Zion Obanla	6 ft 8 in (2.03 m)	215 lb (98 kg)	Sr	Claflin	Houston, NC
PG	2	Jaden Johnson	5 ft 10 in (1.78 m)	175 lb (79 kg)	Jr	Howard CC	Upper Marlboro, MD
PG	3	Trey Brown	6 ft 7 in (2.01 m)	195 lb (88 kg)	Jr	Salt Lake CC	Phoenix, AZ
G	4	Michael Teal	6 ft 1 in (1.85 m)	165 lb (75 kg)	Fr	South Carolina State	Alexandria, VA
F	5	Dorion Staples	6 ft 8 in (2.03 m)	215 lb (98 kg)	Sr	Miles College	Fredericksburg, VA
G	10	Devin Thomas	6 ft 0 in (1.83 m)	165 lb (75 kg)	Fr	CMIT North Academy	Laurel, MD
G/F	11	Javoy Thompson	6 ft 7 in (2.01 m)	205 lb (93 kg)	Jr	UNC Asheville	Bronx, NY
G	12	Justin Monden	6 ft 0 in (1.83 m)	160 lb (73 kg)	Jr	Georgia Southwestern State	Raleigh, NC
F	14	Joseph Locandro	6 ft 9 in (2.06 m)	255 lb (116 kg)	Sr	Concordia	Melbourne, Australia
F	22	Maurice Vassel	6 ft 9 in (2.06 m)	195 lb (88 kg)	So	St. Benedict's Prep	Brooklyn, NY
F	23	Trey Hall	6 ft 9 in (2.06 m)	215 lb (98 kg)	GS	Utah Tech	Willimantic, CT
SF	24	Levi Beckwith	6 ft 7 in (2.01 m)	205 lb (93 kg)	Fr	Heriatge HS	Raleigh, NC
F	31	Maurio Hanson Jr.	6 ft 7 in (2.01 m)	210 lb (95 kg)	So	Robert Morris	Charlotte, NC
PF	35	Christopher Flippin	6 ft 8 in (2.03 m)	240 lb (109 kg)	Sr	Highland CC	Metairie, LA

Head coach

- Cleo Hill Jr. (North Carolina Central)

Assistant coach(es)

- Lance Beckwith (Central Missouri)
- Chuck Ellis (Cheyney)
- Delorian Heard (Redlands)

Legend

- (C) Team captain
- (S) Suspended
- (I) Ineligible
- (W) Walk-on
- Injured
- Current redshirt

Roster
Last update: November 5, 2025

== Schedule and results ==
Date time, TV	Rank^{#}	Opponent^{#}	Result	Record	High points	High rebounds	High assists	Site (attendance) city, state
Non-conference regular season
November 3, 2025*; 7:30 p.m., ACCNX		at Georgia Tech	L 52–56 ^{OT}	0–1	17 – Locandro	6 – Staples	4 – Staples	McCamish Pavilion (3,551); Atlanta, GA
November 5, 2025*; 7:00 p.m., SECN+		at Georgia	L 29–94	0–2	6 – Brown	7 – Brown	2 – Monden	Stegeman Coliseum (5,595); Athens, GA
November 8, 2025*; 4:30 p.m.		Cheyney; Homecoming	W 104–59	1–2	17 – Obanla	4 – Obanla	5 – Teal	Hytche Athletic Center (3,876); Princess Anne, MD
November 11, 2025*; 8:00 p.m., B1G+		at Nebraska	L 50–69	1–3	11 – Hall	5 – Brown	4 – Teal	Pinnacle Bank Arena (13,653); Lincoln, NE
November 14, 2025*; 8:00 p.m., Peacock		at No. 23 Creighton	L 45–84	1–4	13 – Mondran	5 – Locandro	3 – Flippin	CHI Health Center Omaha (16,603); Omaha, NE
November 18, 2025*; 7:00 p.m., ESPN+		at Longwood	W 83–82 ^{2OT}	2–4	19 – Monden	7 – Cooper	4 – Cooper	Joan Perry Brock Center (1,236); Farmville, VA
November 21, 2025*; 7:00 p.m., ESPN+		at Canisius; Queen City Classic	L 57–60	2–5	18 – Locandro	8 – Flippin	4 – Monden	Koessler Athletic Center (577); Buffalo, NY
November 22, 2025*; 3:00 p.m.		vs. Binghamton; Queen City Classic	W 63–52	3–5	16 – Obanla	9 – Obanla	3 – Cooper	Koessler Athletic Center (261); Buffalo, NY
November 25, 2025*; 7:00 p.m.		Hampton	L 68–74	3–6	20 – Obanla	9 – Obanla	4 – Cooper	Hytche Athletic Center (2,112); Princess Anne, MD
November 29, 2025*; 4:00 p.m.		Gwynedd Mercy	W 84–60	4–6	19 – Locandro	8 – Staples	7 – Staples	Hytche Athletic Center (876); Princess Anne, MD
December 2, 2025*; 7:00 p.m., ESPN+		at East Carolina	L 56–68	4–7	10 – Teal	5 – Obanla	6 – Teal	Williams Arena (2,883); Greenville, NC
December 6, 2025*; 2:00 p.m., ESPN+		at American	L 60–78	4–8	20 – Locandro	4 – Locandro	4 – Cooper	Bender Arena (744); Washington, D.C.
December 9, 2025*; 7:00 p.m., ACCNX		at No. 24 Virginia	L 60–84	4–9	9 – Cooper	8 – Cooper	3 – Brown	John Paul Jones Arena (11,117); Charlottesville, VA
December 12, 2025*; 7:00 p.m., FloCollege		at North Carolina A&T	L 79–82	4–10	20 – Cooper	6 – Cooper	8 – Teal	Corbett Sports Center (859); Greensboro, NC
December 14, 2025*; 12:00 p.m., ACCNX		at Virginia Tech	L 53–82	4–11	7 – Staples	5 – Staples	2 – Brown	Cassell Coliseum (4,317); Blacksburg, VA
December 17, 2025*; 7:00 p.m.		at Wagner	L 64–78	4–12	19 – Staples	10 – Obanla	5 – Teal	Spiro Sports Center (350); Staten Island, NY
December 22, 2025*; 8:00 p.m., SECN+		at Texas	L 71–94	4–13	13 – Cooper	7 – Cooper	6 – Teal	Moody Center (10,888); Austin, TX
MEAC regular season
January 3, 2026; 4:30 p.m.		at Morgan State	W 66–49	5–13 (1–0)	16 – Staples	8 – Beckwith	5 – Teal	Hytche Athletic Center (1,025); Princess Anne, MD
January 10, 2026; 4:30 p.m.		Howard	W 69–57	6–13 (2–0)	16 – Staples	7 – Obanla	6 – Teal	Hytche Athletic Center (1,000); Princess Anne, MD
January 12, 2026; 7:00 p.m.		at Norfolk State	W 74–70	7–13 (3–0)	20 – Obanla	8 – Obanla	5 – Teal	Echols Memorial Hall (1,240); Norfolk, VA
January 17, 2026; 4:30 p.m.		Coppin State	W 70–67	8–13 (4–0)	20 – Obanla	4 – Staples	6 – Teal	Hytche Athletic Center (676); Princess Anne, MD
January 31, 2026; 4:00 p.m., ESPN+		at Delaware State	L 57–65	8–14 (4–1)	15 – Obanla	8 – Obanla	3 – Teal	Memorial Hall (483); Dover, DE
February 2, 2026; 8:00 p.m., ESPN+		at North Carolina Central; Rescheduled from Jan. 26	L 63–65	8–15 (4–2)	19 – Obanla	15 – Obanla	6 – Teal	McDougald–McLendon Arena (362); Durham, NC
February 4, 2026; 8:00 p.m., ESPN+		at South Carolina State; Rescheduled from Jan. 24	L 54–63	8–16 (4–3)	19 – Cooper	4 – Obanla	4 – Obanla	SHM Memorial Center (300); Orangeburg, SC
February 7, 2026; 4:00 p.m., ESPN+		at Morgan State	L 71–79	8–17 (4–4)	16 – Staples	12 – Obanla	3 – Teal	Hill Field House (1,288); Baltimore, MD
February 14, 2026; 3:45 p.m., ESPN+		at Howard	L 53–79	8–18 (4–5)	14 – Brown	5 – Locandro	4 – Teal	Burr Gymnasium (1,257); Washington, D.C.
February 16, 2026; 7:00 p.m.		Norfolk State	L 66–70	8–19 (4–6)	19 – Obanla	9 – Obanla	7 – Teal	Hytche Athletic Center (1,100); Princess Anne, MD
February 21, 2026; 4:30 p.m., ESPN+		at Coppin State	L 65–71 ^{OT}	8–20 (4–7)	17 – Cooper	6 – Obanla	3 – Teal	Physical Education Complex (1,890); Baltimore, MD
February 28, 2026; 4:30 p.m.		South Carolina State	W 69–57	9–20 (5–7)	15 – Staples	11 – Flippin	4 – Obanla	Hytche Athletic Center (260); Princess Anne, MD
March 2, 2026; 7:00 p.m.		North Carolina Central	L 73–77	9–21 (5–8)	18 – Obanla	5 – Teal	5 – Teal	Hytche Athletic Center (888); Princess Anne, MD
March 5, 2026; 7:30 pm		Delaware State	L 56–57	9–22 (5–9)	18 – Locandro	6 – Teal	5 – Teal	Hytche Athletic Center (2,026); Princess Anne, MD
MEAC tournament
March 12, 2026; 8:00 pm, ESPN+	(6)	vs. (3) North Carolina Central; Quarterfinals	L 76–83 ^{OT}	9–23	21 – Obanla	8 – Obanla	3 – Tied	Norfolk Scope; Norfolk, VA
*Non-conference game. ^{#}Rankings from AP Poll. (#) Tournament seedings in parentheses. All times are in Eastern.
