= 2025–26 South Carolina State Bulldogs basketball team =

American college basketball season

2025–26 South Carolina State Bulldogs basketball
- Conference: Mid-Eastern Athletic Conference
- Record: 10–22 (7–7 MEAC)
- Head coach: Erik Martin (4th season)
- Associate head coach: Raheem Waller
- Assistant coaches: Bernie Coaxum; Jarelle Redden
- Home arena: SHM Memorial Center

2025–26 MEAC men's basketball standings
	Conf.				Overall
Team	W		L	PCT	W		L	PCT
Howard †	11	–	3	.786	23	–	10	.697
Morgan State	10	–	4	.714	14	–	16	.467
North Carolina Central	8	–	6	.571	14	–	18	.438
Norfolk State	8	–	6	.571	15	–	17	.469
South Carolina State	7	–	7	.500	10	–	22	.313
Maryland Eastern Shore	5	–	9	.357	9	–	23	.281
Coppin State*	5	–	9	.357	7	–	24	.226
Delaware State	2	–	12	.143	8	–	23	.258
† 2026 MEAC tournament winner * Ineligible for both the 2026 NCAA Tournament and MEAC tournament due to APR penalties. As of March 14, 2026

The 2025–26 South Carolina State Bulldogs basketball team represented South Carolina State University during the 2025–26 NCAA Division I men's basketball season. The Bulldogs, led by fourth-year head coach Erik Martin, played their home games at SHM Memorial Center in Orangeburg, South Carolina as members of the Mid-Eastern Athletic Conference.

== Previous season ==
The Bulldogs finished the 2024–25 season 20–13, 11–3 in MEAC play to finish in a tie for first place, claiming at least part of the regular season conference title for the first time since 2004. In the MEAC tournament, they defeated Coppin State in the quarterfinals and then NC Central in the semifinals before falling to top-seeded Norfolk State by a score of 65-66 in the championship game.

== Preseason ==
On October 8, 2025, the MEAC released their preseason polls. South Carolina State was picked to finish third in the conference.

=== Preseason rankings ===
MEAC Preseason Poll
Place	Team	Votes
1	Norfolk State	118 (12)
2	Howard	97 (4)
3	South Carolina State	90
4	Morgan State	73
T–5	Delaware State	70
T–5	North Carolina Central	70
7	Maryland Eastern Shore	31
8	Coppin State	27
(#) first-place votes

=== Preseason MEAC Player of the Year ===
Preseason MEAC Player of the Year
Player	Year	Position
Jayden Johnson	Sophomore	Guard

=== Preseason All-MEAC Teams ===
Preseason All-MEAC Team
Team	Player	Year	Position
First	Jayden Johnson	Sophomore	Guard

== Roster ==
2025–26 South Carolina State Bulldogs men's basketball team
Players
Coaches

Pos.	#	Name	Height	Weight	Year	Previous school	Hometown
G	0	Noah Treadwell	6 ft 5 in (1.96 m)	180 lb (82 kg)	Fr	Middle Georgia Prep	Atlanta, GA
G	1	Florian Tenebay	6 ft 6 in (1.98 m)	195 lb (88 kg)	Sr	Central Georgia Tech	Le Carbet, Martinique
G	2	Colin McKenzie	6 ft 6 in (1.98 m)	200 lb (91 kg)	Sr	Spartanburg Methodist College	Charleston, SC
F	4	Cameron Clark	6 ft 10 in (2.08 m)	225 lb (102 kg)	Sr	Cal State Bakersfield	Gwinnett County, GA
G	5	Owen Bronston Jr	6 ft 6 in (1.98 m)	205 lb (93 kg)	Jr	Edison State CC	Fairfield, OH
F	7	Derwin Hodge Jr	6 ft 10 in (2.08 m)	195 lb (88 kg)	Fr	Peachtree Ridge HS	Suwanee, GA
G	10	Jayden Johnson	6 ft 1 in (1.85 m)	165 lb (75 kg)	So	Cushing Academy	Brooklyn, NY
G	14	Jamal Miles	6 ft 4 in (1.93 m)	190 lb (86 kg)	So	South County HS	Lorton, VA
C	15	Tim Okojie	7 ft 1 in (2.16 m)	225 lb (102 kg)	Jr	St. Petersburg College	Frisco, TX
F	22	James Morrow	6 ft 8 in (2.03 m)	210 lb (95 kg)	Jr	Andrew Jackson HS	Jacksonville, FL
F	23	D'Shay Knights Wright	6 ft 9 in (2.06 m)	210 lb (95 kg)	So	Polaris Prep	Ajax, ON
G	30	Rayniel Wright	6 ft 0 in (1.83 m)	160 lb (73 kg)	Jr	West LA College	Inglewood, CA
F	32	Teon Tindal	6 ft 7 in (2.01 m)	210 lb (95 kg)	Fr	Crestwood HS	Sumter, SC
G	55	Chris Parker	6 ft 6 in (1.98 m)	215 lb (98 kg)	Jr	Ridge View HS	Columbia, SC

Head coach

- Erik Martin (Cincinnati)

Assistant coach(es)

- Bernie Coaxum (Charleston)
- Raheem Waller (South Carolina State)
- Jarelle Redden (North Alabama)

Legend

- (C) Team captain
- (S) Suspended
- (I) Ineligible
- (W) Walk-on
- Injured
- Current redshirt

Roster
Last update: December 6, 2025

== Schedule and results ==
Date time, TV	Rank^{#}	Opponent^{#}	Result	Record	High points	High rebounds	High assists	Site (attendance) city, state
Exhibition
October 31, 2025*; 7:30 pm		Allen	W 92–53	–	13 – Tenebay	7 – Knights Wright	4 – Hodge Jr.	SHM Memorial Center (435); Orangeburg, SC
Regular season
November 3, 2025*; 9:00 pm, ACCN		at No. 11 Louisville	L 45–104	0–1	11 – Wright	5 – Knights Wright	2 – McKenzie	KFC Yum! Center (14,218); Louisville, KY
November 7, 2025*; 8:30 pm, ESPN+		at Samford	L 72–82	0–2	22 – Morrow	7 – Morrow	8 – Johnson	Pete Hanna Center (2,371); Homewood, AL
November 10, 2025*; 7:00 pm, FloSports		at North Carolina A&T	L 62–85	0–3	18 – Bronston Jr.	7 – Bronston Jr.	4 – Johnson	Corbett Sports Center (3,923); Greensboro, NC
November 14, 2025*; 7:00 pm, FloSports		at Charleston	L 61–88	0–4	15 – Bronston Jr.	7 – Okojie	6 – Johnson	TD Arena (5,241); Charleston, SC
November 19, 2025*; 7:00 pm		Chattanooga	L 66–78	0–5	13 – Johnson	6 – Clark	2 – Knights Wright	SHM Memorial Center (200); Orangeburg, SC
November 23, 2025*; 2:00 pm, SL Network		at South Dakota	L 81–82	0–6	17 – Clark	7 – Tenebay	8 – Wright	Sanford Coyote Sports Center (1,235); Vermillion, SD
November 25, 2025*; 8:00 pm, SECN+		at Missouri	L 66–98	0–7	17 – Bronston Jr.	5 – Tindal	3 – Johnson	Mizzou Arena (7,887); Columbia, MO
November 29, 2025*; 4:00 pm, ESPN+		at Winthrop	L 79–101	0–8	17 – Treadwell	4 – Parker	6 – Wright	Winthrop Coliseum (1,131); Rock Hill, SC
December 1, 2025*; 11:00 am, NECFR		at Chicago State	Game cancelled–South Carolina State unable to travel due to inclement weather.					Jones Convocation Center; Chicago, IL
December 5, 2025*; 7:00 pm		at Bethune–Cookman	L 59–80	0–9	14 – Parker	8 – Parker	3 – Johnson	Moore Gymnasium (467); Daytona Beach, FL
December 8, 2025*; 7:00 pm, ESPN+		at Charleston Southern	L 44–84	0–10	8 – Tied	8 – Clark	2 – Knights Wright	Buccaneer Field House (854); North Charleston, SC
December 12, 2025*; 7:00 pm, ESPN+		at Queens	L 78–102	0–11	17 – Bronston Jr.	20 – Parker	11 – Johnson	Curry Arena (368); Charlotte, NC
December 16, 2025*; 6:00 pm		USC Upstate	L 72–78	0–12	16 – Bronston Jr.	7 – Parker	3 – Wright	SHM Memorial Center (185); Orangeburg, SC
December 19, 2025*; 12:00 pm		Brewton-Parker	W 68–54	1−12	16 – Clark	9 – Tied	4 – Johnson	SHM Memorial Center (75); Orangeburg, SC
December 22, 2025*; 4:00 pm, SECN+		at South Carolina	L 70–95	1–13	20 – Johnson	4 – Tied	6 – Johnson	Colonial Life Arena (10,171); Columbia, SC
December 30, 2025*; 8:00 pm, SECN+		at No. 19 Tennessee	L 54–105	1–14	25 – Johnson	4 – Wright	3 – Tied	Food City Center (18,279); Knoxville, TN
January 3, 2026; 4:00 pm		Howard	W 58–57	2–14 (1–0)	24 – Johnson	8 – Clark	4 – Johnson	SHM Memorial Center (425); Orangeburg, SC
January 10, 2026; 4:00 pm, ESPN+		at Morgan State	L 67–72	2–15 (1–1)	23 – Johnson	10 – Hodge Jr.	5 – Johnson	Hill Field House (606); Baltimore, MD
January 12, 2026; 7:00 pm, ESPN+		at Coppin State	W 74–72	3–15 (2–1)	19 – Treadwell	9 – Clark	5 – Johnson	Physical Education Complex (166); Baltimore, MD
January 17, 2026; 4:30 pm, ESPN+		Norfolk State	L 82–89	3–16 (2–2)	16 – Johnson	5 – Clark	5 – Johnson	SHM Memorial Center (1,139); Orangeburg, SC
January 20, 2026*; 7:00 pm		Mid-Atlantic Christian	W 56–50	4–16	18 – Bronston Jr.	13 – Hodge Jr.	4 – Wright	SHM Memorial Center; Orangeburg, SC
January 26, 2026; 6:02 pm, ESPN+		Delaware State	W 70–64	5–16 (3–2)	15 – Bronston Jr.	6 – Johnson	3 – Tenebay	SHM Memorial Center (325); Orangeburg, SC
February 4, 2026; 8:00 pm, ESPN+		Maryland Eastern Shore	W 63–54	6–16 (4–2)	19 – Johnson	6 – Johnson	2 – Tenebay	SHM Memorial Center (300); Orangeburg, SC
February 7, 2026; 7:00 pm, ESPN+		at Howard	L 57–85	6–17 (4–3)	13 – Treadwell	5 – Miles	3 – Hodge Jr.	Burr Gymnasium; Washington, DC
February 16, 2026; 7:00 pm, ESPN+		Coppin State	L 57–59	6–18 (4–4)	11 – Bronston Jr.	7 – Clark	5 – Morrow	SHM Memorial Center (200); Orangeburg, SC
February 18, 2026; 8:00 pm, ESPN+		North Carolina Central; Rescheduled from Jan. 31	W 85–72	7–18 (5–4)	20 – Johnson	7 – Parker	6 – Tied	SHM Memorial Center (350); Orangeburg, SC
February 21, 2026; 4:00 pm, ESPNU		at Norfolk State	L 71–90	7–19 (5–5)	18 – Johnson	7 – Clark	3 – Tied	Echols Memorial Hall (2,140); Norfolk, VA
February 25, 2026; 6:00 pm, ESPN+		Morgan State; Rescheduled from Feb. 14	L 83–90	7–20 (5–6)	19 – Parker	8 – Parker	7 – Johnson	SHM Memorial Center (375); Orangeburg, SC
February 28, 2026; 4:30 pm		at Maryland Eastern Shore	L 57–69	7–21 (5–7)	14 – Johnson	6 – Tied	2 – Tied	Hytche Athletic Center (260); Princess Anne, MD
March 2, 2026; 7:00 pm, ESPN+		at Delaware State	W 61–59	8–21 (6–7)	18 – Treadwell	7 – Tenebay	4 – Hodge Jr.	Memorial Hall (153); Dover, DE
March 5, 2026; 5:00 pm, ESPNU		at North Carolina Central	W 80–64	9–21 (7–7)	16 – Treadwell	8 – Johnson	6 – Johnson	McDougald-McLendon Arena (2,629); Durham, NC
MEAC tournament
March 12, 2026; 6:00 pm, ESPN+	(5)	vs. (4) Norfolk State; Quarterfinals	W 88–82	10–21	28 – Johnson	5 – Tied	3 – Hodge Jr.	Norfolk Scope; Norfolk, VA
March 13, 2026; 6:00 pm, ESPN+	(5)	vs. (1) Howard; Semifinals	L 61–78	10–22	13 – Treadwell	6 – Johnson	6 – Johnson	Norfolk Scope; Norfolk, VA
*Non-conference game. ^{#}Rankings from AP Poll. (#) Tournament seedings in parentheses. All times are in Eastern.
