= Cleo Hill =

American basketball player (1938–2015)

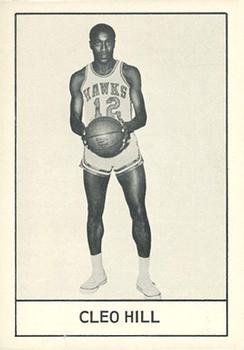

Personal information
- Born: April 24, 1938 Newark, New Jersey, U.S.
- Died: August 10, 2015 (aged 77) Orange, New Jersey, U.S.
- Listed height: 6 ft 1 in (1.85 m)
- Listed weight: 185 lb (84 kg)

Career information
- High school: South Side (Newark, New Jersey)
- College: Winston-Salem State (1957–1961)
- NBA draft: 1961: 1st round, 8th overall pick
- Drafted by: St. Louis Hawks
- Playing career: 1961–1968
- Position: Point guard
- Number: 24, 12

Career history
- 1961–1962: St. Louis Hawks
- 1962–1963: Washington Tapers
- 1963–1965: Trenton Colonials
- 1965–1967: New Haven Elms
- 1967–1968: Scranton Miners

Career NBA statistics
- Points: 320 (5.5 ppg)
- Rebounds: 178 (3.1 rpg)
- Assists: 114 (2.0 apg)
- Stats at NBA.com
- Stats at Basketball Reference
- Collegiate Basketball Hall of Fame

Cleo Hill (April 24, 1938 – August 10, 2015) was an American professional basketball player who was selected by the St. Louis Hawks in the first round (8th overall) of the 1961 NBA draft. A 6 ft 1 in (1.85 m) guard from Newark, New Jersey and the Winston-Salem State University, Hill played in the National Basketball Association for one season with the Hawks, in 1961–62, averaging 5.5 points in 58 games. Hill was only the fifth African-American from an historically Black college and university to be taken in the first round of an NBA draft.

In 2008, Hill was profiled in a segment on the ESPN documentary Black Magic, which told the story of African Americans and basketball. The segment asserted that early in that 1961–62 season, St. Louis Hawks coach Paul Seymour was told by team management to severely diminish Hill's offensive role so that stars Bob Pettit, Cliff Hagan, and Clyde Lovellette (who were all white) would receive more shot attempts. Seymour refused and was fired, and Hill's scoring averaged dropped from 10.8 points per game to 5.5 points per game. Hill never played in the NBA after that season.

Hill had denied that his race was a factor in his NBA struggles, saying, "It wasn't racial. It was points." He went on to become a successful head coach at Essex County College in Newark, New Jersey. A resident of Orange, New Jersey, Hill died at his home there on August 10, 2015.

== Legacy ==
The March 18, 2022 game at Wofford at The Basketball Classic was designated the Cleo Hill Game. Due to scheduling issues the game was not played.

Hill Sr. is the father of current University of Maryland Eastern Shore men's basketball head coach, Cleo Hill Jr.

== Career statistics ==
Legend
GP	Games played	GS	Games started	MPG	Minutes per game
FG%	Field goal percentage	3P%	3-point field goal percentage	FT%	Free throw percentage
RPG	Rebounds per game	APG	Assists per game	SPG	Steals per game
BPG	Blocks per game	PPG	Points per game	**Bold**	Career high

=== NBA ===
==== Regular season ====
Year	Team	GP	MPG	FG%	FT%	RPG	APG	PPG
1961–62	St. Louis	58	18.1	.346	.774	3.1	2.0	5.5
