= 2025–26 Morgan State Bears basketball team =

American college basketball season

2025–26 Morgan State Bears basketball
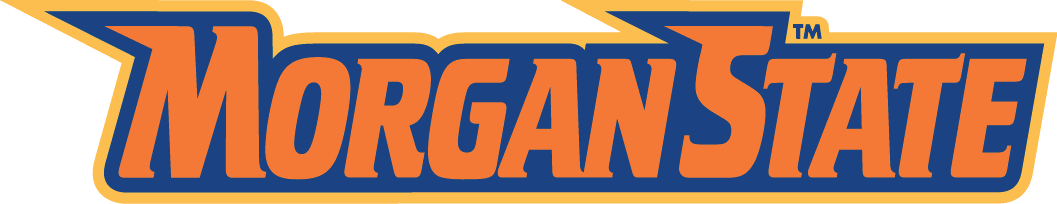
- Conference: Mid-Eastern Athletic Conference
- Record: 14–16 (10–4 MEAC)
- Head coach: Kevin Broadus (7th season)
- Associate head coach: Chretien Lukusa (2nd season)
- Assistant coaches: Keith Goodie (4th season); Austin Freeman (3rd season); Keith Coutreyer (2nd season)
- Home arena: Hill Field House

2025–26 MEAC men's basketball standings
| | Conf. | | | | Overall |
| Team | W | | L | PCT | W | | L | PCT |
|---|---|---|---|---|---|---|---|---|
| Howard | 11 | – | 3 | .786 | 21 | – | 10 | .677 |
| Morgan State | 10 | – | 4 | .714 | 14 | – | 16 | .467 |
| North Carolina Central | 8 | – | 6 | .571 | 12 | – | 17 | .414 |
| Norfolk State | 8 | – | 6 | .571 | 15 | – | 16 | .484 |
| South Carolina State | 7 | – | 7 | .500 | 9 | – | 21 | .300 |
| Maryland Eastern Shore | 5 | – | 9 | .357 | 9 | – | 22 | .290 |
| Coppin State* | 5 | – | 9 | .357 | 7 | – | 24 | .226 |
| Delaware State | 2 | – | 12 | .143 | 8 | – | 22 | .267 |
† 2026 MEAC tournament winner * Ineligible for both the 2026 NCAA Tournament and MEAC tournament due to APR penalties. As of March 11, 2026

The 2025–26 Morgan State Bears basketball team represented Morgan State University in the 2025–26 NCAA Division I men's basketball season. The Bears, led by seventh-year head coach Kevin Broadus, played their home games at Hill Field House in Baltimore, Maryland as members of the Mid-Eastern Athletic Conference (MEAC).

== Previous season ==
The Bears finished the 2024–25 season 14–18, 7–7 in MEAC play, to finish tied for fourth place with Howard. They defeated Howard in the quarterfinals of the MEAC tournament before losing to eventual tournament champions Norfolk State in the semifinals.

== Offseason ==
=== Departures ===
Departures
| Name | No. | Pos. | Height | Weight | Year | Hometown | Reason for departure |
|---|---|---|---|---|---|---|---|
| Kameron Hobbs | 0 | G | 5' 10" | 170 | RS Senior | Stockbridge, GA | Completed eligibility |
| Wynston Tabbs | 1 | G | 6' 3" | 195 | Graduate student | Suitland, MD | Completed eligibility |
| Demajion Topps | 2 | G | 6' 0" | 175 | RS Junior | Winona, MS | Graduated |
| Kiran Oliver | 4 | G | 6' 5" | 190 | Junior | Chicago, IL | Transferred to Arkansas Tech |
| Jaden Martin | 9 | F | 6' 10" | 185 | Junior | Miami, FL | Transferred to Clark Atlanta |
| Will Thomas | 10 | F | 6' 6" | 200 | RS Senior | Baltimore, MD | Completed eligibility; signed with St. Vincent's Basketball Club |
| Amahrie Simpkins | 11 | G | 6' 4" | 190 | Senior | Brooklyn, NY | Entered transfer portal |
| Daniel Akitoby | 12 | F | 6' 9" | 230 | Senior | Fairfax, VA | Transferred to UTSA |
| Pierce Shirk | 22 | G | 6' 4" | 200 | Sophomore | Jacksonville, FL | Transferred to Florida College |
| Tytan Newton | 23 | G | 6' 1" | 170 | RS Sophomore | Indianapolis, IN | Entered transfer portal |
| Logan Schayes | 24 | F | 6' 8" | 235 | Sophomore | Scottsdale, AZ | Transferred to Westmont College |
| Xavier Valley | 55 | F | 6' 8" | 205 | Junior | Atlanta, GA | Entered transfer portal |

=== Incoming transfers ===
Incoming transfers
| Name | No. | Pos. | Height | Weight | Year | Hometown | Previous school |
|---|---|---|---|---|---|---|---|
| Christian Meeks | 0 | G | 6' 6" | 215 | Junior | Hazel Crest, IL | Waubonsee Community College |
| Alfred Worrell Jr. | 1 | G | 6' 4" | 210 | Senior | Washington, DC | Southern Miss |
| Elijah Davis | 2 | G | 6' 1" | 175 | Graduate student | Severn, MD | Bowie State |
| Christian Oliver | 21 | F/C | 6' 10" | 250 | Senior | Pasadena, CA | East Los Angeles College |
| Manok Lual | 22 | F | 6' 9" | 185 | Junior | Jacksonville, FL | Frostburg State |
| Dallas James | 42 | C | 7' 1" | 240 | Graduate student | Artesia, CA | Indiana |
| Walter Peggs Jr. | 52 | G | 6' 4" | 195 | Graduate student | Jackson, TN | Spring Hill College |
| Eugene Alvin | 55 | F | 6' 7" | 225 | Junior | Fort Myers, FL | Florida SouthWestern |

College recruiting information
| Name | Hometown | School | Height | Weight | Commit date |
|---|---|---|---|---|---|
| Breon Barnett; G | Douglasville, GA | Chapel Hill High School | 6 ft 1 in (1.85 m) | 175 lb (79 kg) | Feb 7, 2025 |
| Breon Barnett; G | Recruit ratings: No ratings found | | | | |
| David Bumpass; G | Washington, D.C. | Friendship Tech Prep Academy | 6 ft 4 in (1.93 m) | 180 lb (82 kg) | Mar 6, 2025 |
| David Bumpass; G | Recruit ratings: No ratings found | | | | |
Overall recruit ranking:
Note: In many cases, Scout, Rivals, 247Sports, On3, and ESPN may conflict in their listings of height and weight.; In these cases, the average was taken. ESPN grades are on a 100-point scale.; Sources: "2025 Morgan State Signees". ESPN.; "2025 Team Ranking". Rivals.

== Preseason ==
On October 8, 2025, the MEAC released their preseason polls. Morgan State was picked to finish fourth in the conference.

=== Preseason rankings ===
MEAC Preseason Poll
| Place | Team | Votes |
|---|---|---|
| 1 | Norfolk State | 118 (12) |
| 2 | Howard | 97 (4) |
| 3 | South Carolina State | 90 |
| 4 | Morgan State | 73 |
| T–5 | Delaware State | 70 |
| T–5 | North Carolina Central | 70 |
| 7 | Maryland Eastern Shore | 31 |
| 8 | Coppin State | 27 |
(#) first-place votes

=== Preseason All-MEAC Teams ===
Preseason All-MEAC Team
| Team | Player | Year | Position |
|---|---|---|---|
| Third | Walter Peggs Jr. | Graduate senior | Guard |

== Roster ==
2025–26 Morgan State Bears men's basketball team
Players
Coaches

| Pos. | # | Name | Height | Weight | Year | Previous school | Hometown |
|---|---|---|---|---|---|---|---|
| G | 0 | Christian Meeks | 6 ft 6 in (1.98 m) | 215 lb (98 kg) | Jr | Waubonsee CC (IL) | Hazel Crest, IL |
| G | 1 | Alfred Jr. Worrell | 6 ft 4 in (1.93 m) | 210 lb (95 kg) | Sr | Southern Miss | Washington, D.C. |
| G | 2 | Elijah Davis | 6 ft 1 in (1.85 m) | 175 lb (79 kg) | GS | Bowie State | Severn, MD |
| G | 3 | Rob Lawson | 5 ft 11 in (1.8 m) | 175 lb (79 kg) | Sr | National Christian Academy | Capitol Heights, MD |
| G | 4 | David Bumpass | 6 ft 4 in (1.93 m) | 180 lb (82 kg) | Fr | Friendship Tech Prep Academy | Washington, D.C. |
| F | 5 | Matar Wade | 6 ft 8 in (2.03 m) | 210 lb (95 kg) | So | Archbishop Carroll HS (DC) | Dakar, Senegal |
| F | 7 | Marland Harris | 6 ft 9 in (2.06 m) | 215 lb (98 kg) | Sr | West Los Angeles College | Inglewood, CA |
| G | 10 | Breon Barnett | 6 ft 1 in (1.85 m) | 175 lb (79 kg) | Fr | Chapel Hill HS (GA) | Douglasville, GA |
| F | 13 | Trent Edwards | 6 ft 8 in (2.03 m) | 190 lb (86 kg) | Jr | George Rogers Clark HS (KY) | Lexington, KY |
| F/C | 21 | Christian Oliver | 6 ft 10 in (2.08 m) | 250 lb (113 kg) | Sr | East Los Angeles College | Pasadena, CA |
| F | 22 | Manok Lual | 6 ft 9 in (2.06 m) | 185 lb (84 kg) | Jr | Frostburg State | Jacksonville, FL |
| F | 32 | Jayden Socka | 6 ft 9 in (2.06 m) | 260 lb (118 kg) | RS Sr | Prince George's CC (MD) | Silver Spring, MD |
| C | 42 | Dallas James | 7 ft 1 in (2.16 m) | 240 lb (109 kg) | GS | Indiana | Artesia, CA |
| G | 52 | Walter Jr. Peggs | 6 ft 4 in (1.93 m) | 195 lb (88 kg) | GS | Spring Hill College | Jackson, TN |
| F | 55 | Eugene Alvin | 6 ft 7 in (2.01 m) | 225 lb (102 kg) | Jr | Florida SouthWestern | Fort Myers, FL |

Head coach

- Kevin Broadus (Bowie State)

Assistant coach(es)

- Chretien Lukusa (Binghamton)
- Keith Goodie (Morgan State)
- Austin Freeman (Georgetown)
- Keith Coutreyer (Columbia Union)

Legend

- (C) Team captain
- (S) Suspended
- (I) Ineligible
- (W) Walk-on
- Injured
- Current redshirt

Roster
Last update: November 10, 2025

== Schedule and results ==
| Date time, TV | Rank^{#} | Opponent^{#} | Result | Record | Site (attendance) city, state |
Regular season
| November 3, 2025*; 6:30 p.m., ESPN+ | | at Georgetown | L 70–87 | 0–1 | Capital One Arena (4,208); Washington, DC |
| November 6, 2025*; 6:00 p.m. | | Central Penn | W 101–77 | 1–1 | Hill Field House (1,386); Baltimore, MD |
| November 11, 2025*; 6:00 p.m. | | UMBC | L 79–81 | 1–2 | Hill Field House; Baltimore, MD |
| November 15, 2025*; 4:00 p.m., NEC Front Row | | at Mercyhurst | L 72–86 | 1–3 | Mercyhurst Athletic Center (372); Erie, PA |
| November 18, 2025*; 7:00 p.m., ESPN+ | | North Carolina A&T | L 73–79 | 1–4 | Hill Field House (2,496); Baltimore, MD |
| November 21, 2025*; 7:00 p.m., ESPN+ | | at Old Dominion | L 56–88 | 1–5 | Chartway Arena (4,844); Norfolk, VA |
| November 25, 2025*; 6:00 p.m. | | Drexel | L 66–71 | 1–6 | Hill Field House (397); Baltimore, MD |
| December 6, 2025*; 4:00 p.m., ESPN+ | | Longwood | L 80–84 | 1–7 | Hill Field House; Baltimore, MD |
| December 9, 2025*; 8:00 p.m. | | at DePaul | L 49−92 | 1−8 | Wintrust Arena (2,966); Chicago, IL |
| December 13, 2025*; 4:00 p.m. | | Niagara | W 81–73 | 2–8 | Hill Field House (368); Baltimore, MD |
| December 19, 2025*; 10:00 p.m., ACCNX | | at California | L 50–97 | 2–9 | Haas Pavilion (1,894); Berkeley, CA |
| December 21, 2025*; 6:00 p.m., ESPN+ | | at San Francisco | L 64–94 | 2–10 | Sobrato Center (1,684); San Francisco, CA |
| December 23, 2025*; 6:00 p.m., ESPN+ | | at Loyola Marymount | L 56–83 | 2–11 | Gersten Pavilion (927); Los Angeles, CA |
| December 30, 2025*; 6:00 p.m. | | Penn State Brandywine | W 92–55 | 3–11 | Hill Field House (271); Baltimore, MD |
| January 3, 2026; 4:30 p.m. | | at Maryland Eastern Shore | L 49–66 | 3–12 (0–1) | Hytche Athletic Center (1,025); Princess Anne, MD |
| January 10, 2026; 4:00 p.m., ESPN+ | | South Carolina State | W 72–67 | 4–12 (1–1) | Hill Field House (606); Baltimore, MD |
| January 12, 2026; 6:00 p.m. | | North Carolina Central | L 78–89 | 4–13 (1–2) | Hill Field House (471); Baltimore, MD |
| January 17, 2026; 4:00 p.m., ESPN+ | | Delaware State | W 80–79 | 5–13 (2–2) | Memorial Hall (374); Dover, DE |
| January 20, 2026*; 6:00 p.m. | | Virginia Lynchburg | W 128–53 | 6–13 | Hill Field House (372); Baltimore, MD |
| January 24, 2026; 2:00 p.m., ESPN+ | | at Howard | W 78–77 | 7–13 (3–2) | Burr Gymnasium; Washington, DC |
| January 26, 2026; 7:00 p.m. | | Norfolk State | W 79–78 | 8–13 (4–2) | Echols Hall (2,139); Norfolk, VA |
| January 31, 2026; 4:30 p.m., ESPN+ | | Coppin State | W 89−80 | 9−13 (5−2) | Physical Education Complex (1,396); Baltimore, MD |
| February 7, 2026; 4:00 p.m., ESPN+ | | Maryland Eastern Shore | W 79–71 | 10–13 (6–2) | Hill Field House (1,288); Baltimore, MD |
| February 16, 2026; 7:00 p.m., ESPN+ | | at North Carolina Central | L 76–80 | 10–14 (6–3) | McDougald-McLendon Arena (1,554); Durham, NC |
| February 21, 2026; 4:00 p.m., ESPN+ | | Delaware State | W 82–68 | 11–14 (7–3) | Hill Field House (1,478); Baltimore, MD |
| February 25, 2026; 5:00 p.m., ESPN+ | | at South Carolina State; Rescheduled from Feb. 14 | W 90–83 | 12–14 (8–3) | SHM Memorial Center (375); Orangeburg, SC |
| February 28, 2026; 4:00 p.m., ESPN+ | | Howard | L 59–84 | 12–15 (8–4) | Hill Field House (3,237); Baltimore, MD |
| March 2, 2026; 6:00 p.m. | | Norfolk State | W 90–84 | 13–15 (9–4) | Hill Field House (2,612); Baltimore, MD |
| March 5, 2026; 8:00 p.m., ESPN+ | | Coppin State | W 70–66 | 14–15 (10–4) | Hill Field House (3,071); Baltimore, MD |
MEAC tournament
| March 11, 2026; 6:00 pm, ESPN+ | (2) | vs. (7) Delaware State; Quarterfinals | L 70–75 ^{OT} | 14–16 | Norfolk Scope; Norfolk, VA |
*Non-conference game. ^{#}Rankings from AP Poll. (#) Tournament seedings in parentheses. All times are in Eastern.
