= 2026 MEAC men's basketball tournament =

American college basketball tournament

- Classification: Division I
- Season: 2025–26
- Teams: 7
- Site: Norfolk Scope; Norfolk, Virginia
- Champions: Howard (6th title)
- Winning coach: Kenny Blakeney (3rd title)
- MVP: Bryce Harris (Howard)
- Television: ESPN+ and ESPN2

2025–26 MEAC men's basketball standings
	Conf.				Overall
Team	W		L	PCT	W		L	PCT
Howard †	11	–	3	.786	23	–	10	.697
Morgan State	10	–	4	.714	14	–	16	.467
North Carolina Central	8	–	6	.571	14	–	18	.438
Norfolk State	8	–	6	.571	15	–	17	.469
South Carolina State	7	–	7	.500	10	–	22	.313
Maryland Eastern Shore	5	–	9	.357	9	–	23	.281
Coppin State*	5	–	9	.357	7	–	24	.226
Delaware State	2	–	12	.143	8	–	23	.258
† 2026 MEAC tournament winner * Ineligible for both the 2026 NCAA Tournament and MEAC tournament due to APR penalties. As of March 14, 2026

The 2026 MEAC men's basketball tournament was the postseason men's basketball tournament for the 2025–26 season in the Mid-Eastern Athletic Conference (MEAC). The tournament was held March 11–14, 2026, at Norfolk Scope in Norfolk, Virginia. The tournament winner, Howard, received the conference's automatic invitation to the 2026 NCAA Division I men's basketball tournament.

== Seeds ==
Seven of the conference's eight members were eligible for the tournament and seeded by record within the conference, with a tiebreaker system to seed teams with identical conference records. Coppin State was ineligible to compete in the tournament due to Academic Progress Rate penalties.

Seed	School	Conference	Tiebreaker
1	Howard	11–3	
2	Morgan State	10–4	
3	North Carolina Central	8–6	2–0 vs. Morgan State
4	Norfolk State	8–6	0–2 vs. Morgan State
5	South Carolina State	7–7	
6	Maryland Eastern Shore	5–9	1–1 vs. Howard
Inel	Coppin State	5–9	0–2 vs. Howard
7	Delaware State	2–12	

== Schedule ==
Game	Time*	Matchup^{#}	Score	Television
Quarterfinals – Wednesday, March 11
1	6:00 p.m.	No. 2 Morgan State vs. No. 7 Delaware State	70–75^{OT}	ESPN+
Quarterfinals – Thursday, March 12
2	6:00 p.m.	No. 4 Norfolk State vs. No. 5 South Carolina State	82–88	ESPN+
3	8:00 p.m.	No. 3 North Carolina Central vs. No. 6 Maryland Eastern Shore	83–76^{OT}	ESPN+
Semifinals – Friday, March 13
4	6:00 p.m.	No. 1 Howard vs. No. 5 South Carolina State	78–61	ESPN+
5	8:00 p.m.	No. 3 North Carolina Central vs. No. 7 Delaware State	59–53	ESPN+
Championship – Saturday, March 14
6	1:00 p.m.	No. 1 Howard vs. No. 3 North Carolina Central	70–63	ESPN2
*Game times in EST. #-Rankings denote tournament seeding.

== Bracket ==
Quarterfinals; March 11–12; ESPN+
4	Norfolk State	82
5	South Carolina State	88
2	Morgan State	70
7	Delaware State	75*
3	North Carolina Central	83*
6	Maryland Eastern Shore	76

Semifinals; March 13; ESPN+
1	Howard	78
5	South Carolina State	61
7	Delaware State	53
3	North Carolina Central	59

Championship; March 14; ESPN2
1	Howard	70
3	North Carolina Central	63

* denotes overtime period

== Awards and Honors ==
=== All-Tournament Team ===
Player	Team
**Bryce Harris**	Howard
Cam Gillus	Howard
Cedric Taylor III	Howard
Dionte Johnson	North Carolina Central
Gage Lattimore	North Carolina Central

MVP in bold
