= 2025–26 Norfolk State Spartans men's basketball team =

American college basketball season

2025–26 Norfolk State Spartans men's basketball
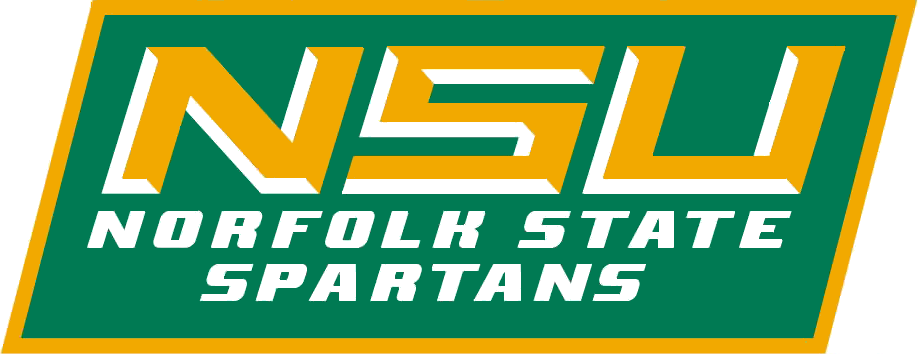
- Conference: Mid-Eastern Athletic Conference
- Record: 15–17 (8–6 MEAC)
- Head coach: Robert Jones (13th season)
- Associate head coach: Jamal Brown
- Assistant coaches: C.J. Clemons; Leonard Fairley; Kyonze Chavis; Corey Coffer
- Home arena: Echols Hall

2025–26 MEAC men's basketball standings
| | Conf. | | | | Overall |
| Team | W | | L | PCT | W | | L | PCT |
|---|---|---|---|---|---|---|---|---|
| Howard † | 11 | – | 3 | .786 | 23 | – | 10 | .697 |
| Morgan State | 10 | – | 4 | .714 | 14 | – | 16 | .467 |
| North Carolina Central | 8 | – | 6 | .571 | 14 | – | 18 | .438 |
| Norfolk State | 8 | – | 6 | .571 | 15 | – | 17 | .469 |
| South Carolina State | 7 | – | 7 | .500 | 10 | – | 22 | .313 |
| Maryland Eastern Shore | 5 | – | 9 | .357 | 9 | – | 23 | .281 |
| Coppin State* | 5 | – | 9 | .357 | 7 | – | 24 | .226 |
| Delaware State | 2 | – | 12 | .143 | 8 | – | 23 | .258 |
† 2026 MEAC tournament winner * Ineligible for both the 2026 NCAA Tournament and MEAC tournament due to APR penalties. As of March 14, 2026

The 2025–26 Norfolk State Spartans men's basketball team represented Norfolk State University during the 2025–26 NCAA Division I men's basketball season. The Spartans, led by 13th-year head coach Robert Jones, played their home games at Echols Hall in Norfolk, Virginia as members of the Mid-Eastern Athletic Conference.

== Previous season ==
The Spartans finished the 2024–25 season 24–11, 11–3 in MEAC play to finish as MEAC regular season champions. They defeated Maryland Eastern Shore, Morgan State and South Carolina State to win the 2025 MEAC men's basketball tournament and earn the MEAC's automatic bid to the 2025 NCAA Division I men's basketball tournament, their fourth bid all−time. The Spartans were defeated in their first round match up against eventual National Champion Florida Gators, 95–69.

== Preseason ==
On October 8, 2025, the MEAC released their preseason polls. Norfolk State was picked to finish first in the conference, while receiving twelve first-place votes.

=== Preseason rankings ===
MEAC Preseason Poll
| Place | Team | Votes |
|---|---|---|
| 1 | Norfolk State | 118 (12) |
| 2 | Howard | 97 (4) |
| 3 | South Carolina State | 90 |
| 4 | Morgan State | 73 |
| T–5 | Delaware State | 70 |
| T–5 | North Carolina Central | 70 |
| 7 | Maryland Eastern Shore | 31 |
| 8 | Coppin State | 27 |
(#) first-place votes

=== Preseason All-MEAC Teams ===
Preseason All-MEAC Team
| Team | Player | Year | Position |
|---|---|---|---|
| Third | Keyontae Lewis | Senior | Forward |
| Third | Anthony McComb III | Senior | Guard |

== Roster ==
2025–26 Norfolk State Spartans men's basketball team
Players
Coaches

| Pos. | # | Name | Height | Weight | Year | Previous school | Hometown |
|---|---|---|---|---|---|---|---|
| G | 0 | Adrean Newton | 6 ft 0 in (1.83 m) | 165 lb (75 kg) | Fr | Maury High School | Norfolk, Virginia |
| G | 1 | Dian Wright-Forde | 6 ft 3 in (1.91 m) | 215 lb (98 kg) | | Texas A&M–Corpus Cristi | Bay Shore, New York |
| G | 2 | Elijah Jamison | 6 ft 3 in (1.91 m) | 195 lb (88 kg) | Sr | UNC Wilmington | Louisburg, North Carolina |
| G | 3 | My'kel Jenkins | 6 ft 5 in (1.96 m) | 195 lb (88 kg) | RS Fr | Woodside High School | Tarboro, North Carolina |
| F | 6 | Melo Baines | 6 ft 8 in (2.03 m) | 225 lb (102 kg) | So | Lake Taylor High School | Norfolk, Virginia |
| G | 7 | Anthony McComb III | 6 ft 3 in (1.91 m) | 180 lb (82 kg) | Sr | New Hampshire | Dayton, Ohio |
| F | 11 | Devon Ellis | 6 ft 7 in (2.01 m) | 225 lb (102 kg) | Sr | Valparaiso | Schaumburg, Illinois |
| G | 13 | Ahmad Torrence | 6 ft 5 in (1.96 m) | 200 lb (91 kg) | Fr | Thurgood Marshall Academy | New York, New York |
| F | 14 | Yel Deeng | 6 ft 8 in (2.03 m) | 200 lb (91 kg) | Jr | Casper Community College | Amarillo, Texas |
| G | 15 | Mekhi Reid | 6 ft 4 in (1.93 m) | 175 lb (79 kg) | RS Jr | Mary Baldwin | Virginia Beach, Virginia |
| G | 20 | Jordan Leaks | 6 ft 3 in (1.91 m) | 170 lb (77 kg) | RS So | Phoebus High School | Hampton, Virginia |
| F | 21 | Jaquel Morris | 6 ft 8 in (2.03 m) | 220 lb (100 kg) | Sr | St. Peter's | Brooklyn, New York |
| F | 23 | Keyontae Lewis | 6 ft 9 in (2.06 m) | 260 lb (118 kg) | Sr | Wagner | Richmond, Virginia |
| G | 35 | Dramane Camara | 6 ft 6 in (1.98 m) | 215 lb (98 kg) | Jr | DePaul | Paris, France |

Head coach

- Robert Jones (SUNY New Paltz)

Assistant coach(es)

- Jamal Brown (South Carolina State)
- C.J. Clemons (Norfolk State)
- Leonard Fairley (Norfolk State)
- Kyonze Chavis (Norfolk State)
- Corey Coffer (Norfolk State)

Legend

- (C) Team captain
- (S) Suspended
- (I) Ineligible
- (W) Walk-on
- Injured
- Current redshirt

Roster
Last update: November 13, 2025

== Schedule and results ==
| Date time, TV | Rank^{#} | Opponent^{#} | Result | Record | High points | High rebounds | High assists | Site (attendance) city, state |
Non-conference regular season
| November 3, 2025*; 7:00 pm, ESPN+ | | Washington Adventist | W 98–76 | 1–0 | 19 – McComb III | 6 – Tied | 4 – Tied | Echols Hall (1,820); Norfolk, VA |
| November 5, 2025*; 7:00 pm, ESPN+ | | Regent | W 119–55 | 2–0 | 19 – Ellis | 7 – Tied | 6 – Leaks | Echols Hall (1,737); Norfolk, VA |
| November 8, 2025*; 4:00 pm, ESPN+ | | William & Mary | L 78–81 | 2–1 | 19 – McComb III | 7 – Tied | 5 – Jamison | Echols Hall (1,836); Norfolk, VA |
| November 11, 2025*; 7:00 pm, ESPN+ | | at Old Dominion | L 57–60 | 2–2 | 14 – Jamison | 7 – Ellis | 3 – Jamison | Chartway Arena (7,951); Norfolk, VA |
| November 14, 2025*; 8:00 pm, ESPN+ | | at Towson | L 41–51 | 2–3 | 8 – Tied | 8 – McComb III | 3 – Jamison | TU Arena (2,323); Towson, MD |
| November 21, 2025*; 8:00 pm, ESPN+ | | Hampton; Battle of the Bay | W 62–60 | 3–3 | 18 – Jamison | 6 – Leaks | 2 – Tied | Echols Hall (3,912); Norfolk, VA |
| November 23, 2025*; 4:00 pm, MWN | | at Wyoming | L 67–75 | 3–4 | 19 – Tied | 6 – McComb III | 2 – Wright-Forde | Arena-Auditorium (3,245); Laramie, WY |
| November 25, 2025*; 7:00 pm, ESPN+ | | Virginia–Lynchburg | W 136–79 | 4–4 | 30 – Baines | 9 – McComb III | 11 – Jamison | Echols Hall (1,312); Norfolk, VA |
| November 29, 2025*; 4:00 pm, ESPN+ | | at No. 2 Arizona | L 61–98 | 4–5 | 19 – McComb III | 5 – Deeng | 2 – Tied | McKale Center (13,461); Tucson, AZ |
| December 6, 2025*; 2:00 pm, ESPN+ | | at James Madison | L 67–68 | 4–6 | 17 – Tied | 10 – Leaks | 2 – Jamison | Atlantic Union Bank Center (2,730); Harrisonburg, VA |
| December 10, 2025*; 12:00 pm, ESPN+ | | at Baylor | L 67–97 | 4–7 | 19 – Tied | 6 – McComb III | 3 – Newton | Foster Pavilion (4,584); Waco, TX |
| December 18, 2025*; 7:30 pm, ESPNU | | vs. Grambling State; Chris Paul HBCU Challenge | L 68–80 | 4–8 | 26 – Jamison | 7 – Tied | 4 – McComb III | Gateway Center Arena (535); Atlanta, GA |
| December 19, 2025*; 7:30 pm, ESPNU | | vs. Jackson State; Chris Paul HBCU Challenge | W 82–72 | 5–8 | 30 – Jamison | 8 – Morris | 7 – Newton | Gateway Center Arena (375); Atlanta, GA |
| December 21, 2025*; 9:00 pm, ESPN+ | | at UTEP; WestStar Don Haskins Sun Bowl Invitational semifinals | W 72–71 | 6–8 | 21 – McComb III | 6 – Ellis | 5 – Newton | Don Haskins Center (3,525); El Paso, TX |
| December 22, 2025*; 7:00 pm, ESPN+ | | vs. UC Irvine; WestStar Don Haskins Sun Bowl Invitational championship | L 70–89 | 6–9 | 17 – McComb III | 5 – Tied | 3 – Jenkins | Don Haskins Center (2,816); El Paso, TX |
| December 28, 2025*; 3:00 pm, ESPN+ | | at Louisiana | L 54–63 | 6–10 | 16 – Leaks | 8 – Leaks | 4 – Tied | Cajundome (2,454); Lafayette, LA |
MEAC regular season
| January 3, 2026; 4:30 pm, ESPN+ | | at North Carolina Central | L 67–69 | 6–11 (0–1) | 18 – Ellis | 8 – Ellis | 4 – Ellis | McDougald–McLendon Arena (1,054); Durham, NC |
| January 10, 2026; 4:00 pm, ESPN+ | | at Delaware State | W 66–64 | 7–11 (1–1) | 23 – McComb III | 4 – Lewis | 4 – Newton | Memorial Hall (500); Dover, DE |
| January 12, 2026; 7:00 pm, ESPN+ | | Maryland Eastern Shore | L 70–74 | 7–12 (1–2) | 15 – Jamison | 5 – Lewis | 6 – Jamison | Echols Hall (1,240); Norfolk, VA |
| January 17, 2026; 4:30 pm, ESPN+ | | at South Carolina State | W 89–82 | 8–12 (2–2) | 19 – McComb III | 7 – Lewis | 3 – Jamison | SHM Memorial Center (1,139); Orangeburg, SC |
| January 19, 2026*; 7:00 p.m., ESPN+ | | Elizabeth City State | W 86–61 | 9–12 | 25 – McComb III | 7 – McComb III | 3 – Tied | Echols Hall (2,157); Norfolk, VA |
| January 24, 2026; 4:00 pm, ESPN+ | | Coppin State | W 103–76 | 10–12 (3–2) | 29 – McComb III | 8 – Morris | 6 – McComb III | Echols Hall (1,483); Norfolk, VA |
| January 26, 2026; 7:00 pm, ESPN+ | | Morgan State | L 78–79 | 10–13 (3–3) | 23 – Morris | 7 – Ellis | 3 – Tied | Echols Hall (2,139); Norfolk, VA |
| January 31, 2026; 4:00 pm, ESPN+ | | at Howard | L 60–88 | 10–14 (3–4) | 13 – Leaks | 5 – Jamison | 2 – Tied | Burr Gymnasium (1,848); Washington, D.C. |
| February 7, 2026; 4:00 pm, ESPN+ | | North Carolina Central | W 75–68 | 11–14 (4–4) | 28 – Jamison | 7 – Morris | 3 – Tied | Echols Hall (2,235); Norfolk, VA |
| February 14, 2026; 4:00 pm, ESPN+ | | Delaware State | W 75–58 | 12–14 (5–4) | 17 – Ellis | 7 – Newton | 4 – Tied | Echols Hall (2,431); Norfolk, VA |
| February 16, 2026; 7:00 pm, ESPN+ | | at Maryland Eastern Shore | W 70–66 | 13–14 (6–4) | 17 – Tied | 6 – Ellis | 5 – Jamison | Hytche Athletic Center (1,100); Princess Anne, MD |
| February 21, 2026; 4:00 pm, ESPN+ | | South Carolina State | W 90–71 | 14–14 (7–4) | 24 – McComb III | 6 – Baines | 6 – Jamison | Echols Hall (2,140); Norfolk, VA |
| February 28, 2026; 4:30 pm, ESPN+ | | at Coppin State | W 75–69 | 15–14 (8–4) | 22 – McComb III | 6 – Ellis | 2 – Tied | Physical Education Complex (428); Baltimore, MD |
| March 2, 2026; 6:00 pm, ESPN+ | | at Morgan State | L 84–90 | 15–15 (8–5) | 23 – McComb III | 12 – Morris | 5 – Newton | Hill Field House (2,612); Baltimore, MD |
| March 5, 2026; 7:00 pm, ESPN+ | | Howard | L 76–84 | 15–16 (8–6) | 22 – Gillus | 7 – Harris | 4 – Gillus | Echols Hall (4,165); Norfolk, VA |
MEAC tournament
| March 12, 2026; 6:00 pm, ESPN+ | (4) | vs. (5) South Carolina State; Quarterfinals | L 82–88 | 15–17 | 24 – Jamison | 6 – Ellis | 2 – Tied | Norfolk Scope Arena; Norfolk, Virginia |
*Non-conference game. ^{#}Rankings from AP Poll. (#) Tournament seedings in parentheses. All times are in Eastern.
