= Kenny Blakeney =

American basketball coach

Current position
- Title: Head coach
- Team: Howard
- Conference: MEAC
- Record: 100–110 (.476)

Biographical details
- Born: November 29, 1971 (age 54); Washington, D.C., U.S.

Playing career
- 1991–1995: Duke

Coaching career (HC unless noted)
- 1995–1996: James Madison (assistant)
- 1996–1997: La Salle (assistant)
- 1997–2001: Delaware (assistant)
- 2001–2002: Seton Hall (assistant)
- 2002–2005: Delaware (assistant)
- 2006–2007: Marshall (assistant)
- 2007–2011: Harvard (assistant)
- 2018–2019: Columbia (assistant)
- 2019–present: Howard

Head coaching record
- Overall: 100–110 (.476)
- Tournaments: 1–3 (NCAA Division I)

Accomplishments and honors

Championships
- 3 MEAC tournament (2023, 2024, 2026); MEAC regular season (2023, 2026)

Awards
- MEAC Coach of the Year (2023)

Kenneth L. Blakeney (born November 29, 1971) is an American basketball coach. He is the head coach of the Howard Bison men's basketball team.

== Playing career ==
After a high school playing career at DeMatha Catholic High School under Morgan Wootten, where he was named the Gatorade Player of the Year in the state of Maryland, Blakeney played collegiately at Duke under Mike Krzyzewski where he was part of the Blue Devils' 1991 NCAA Championship season as a redshirting freshman, and the 1992 NCAA Championship season. He also served as team captain his senior year.

== Coaching career ==
=== Assistant coaching (1995–2019) ===
Upon graduating, Blakeney landed his first assistant coaching position under Lefty Driesell at James Madison, where he stayed for one season before another one-year stop at La Salle. Blakeney joined former Duke assistant coach Mike Brey's staff at Delaware, where he stayed from 1997 to 2001. During the 2001–02 season, Blakeney served as an assistant coach at Seton Hall before returning to Delaware for a second assistant coaching stint. In 2006, Blakeney became an assistant coach at Marshall before joining another former assistant coach from his playing days, working with Tommy Amaker at Harvard. In 2011, Blakeney left coaching for the private sector, working at Under Armour in the company's marketing division. He returned to coaching in 2018, joining the staff at Columbia.

=== Howard (2019–present) ===
On May 6, 2019, Blakeney was named the 10th head coach in Howard men's basketball history, replacing Kevin Nickelberry. Blakeney signed the top recruit in Howard history, Makur Maker, on July 3, 2020.

== Head coaching record ==
Record table
Season	Team	Overall	Conference	Standing	Postseason
Howard Bison (Mid-Eastern Athletic Conference) (2019–present)
2019–20	Howard	4–29	1–15	9th	
2020–21	Howard	1–4	0–0		
2021–22	Howard	16–13	9–5	2nd	
2022–23	Howard	22–13	11–3	1st	NCAA Division I Round of 64
2023–24	Howard	18–17	9–5	T–2nd	NCAA Division I First Four
2024–25	Howard	12–20	7–7	T–4th	
2025–26	Howard	24–11	11–3	1st	NCAA Division I Round of 64
2026–27	Howard	3–3	0–0		
Howard:		100–110 (.476)	48–38 (.558)		
Total:		100–110 (.476)			
