= Stan Waterman (basketball) =

American basketball coach (born 1966)

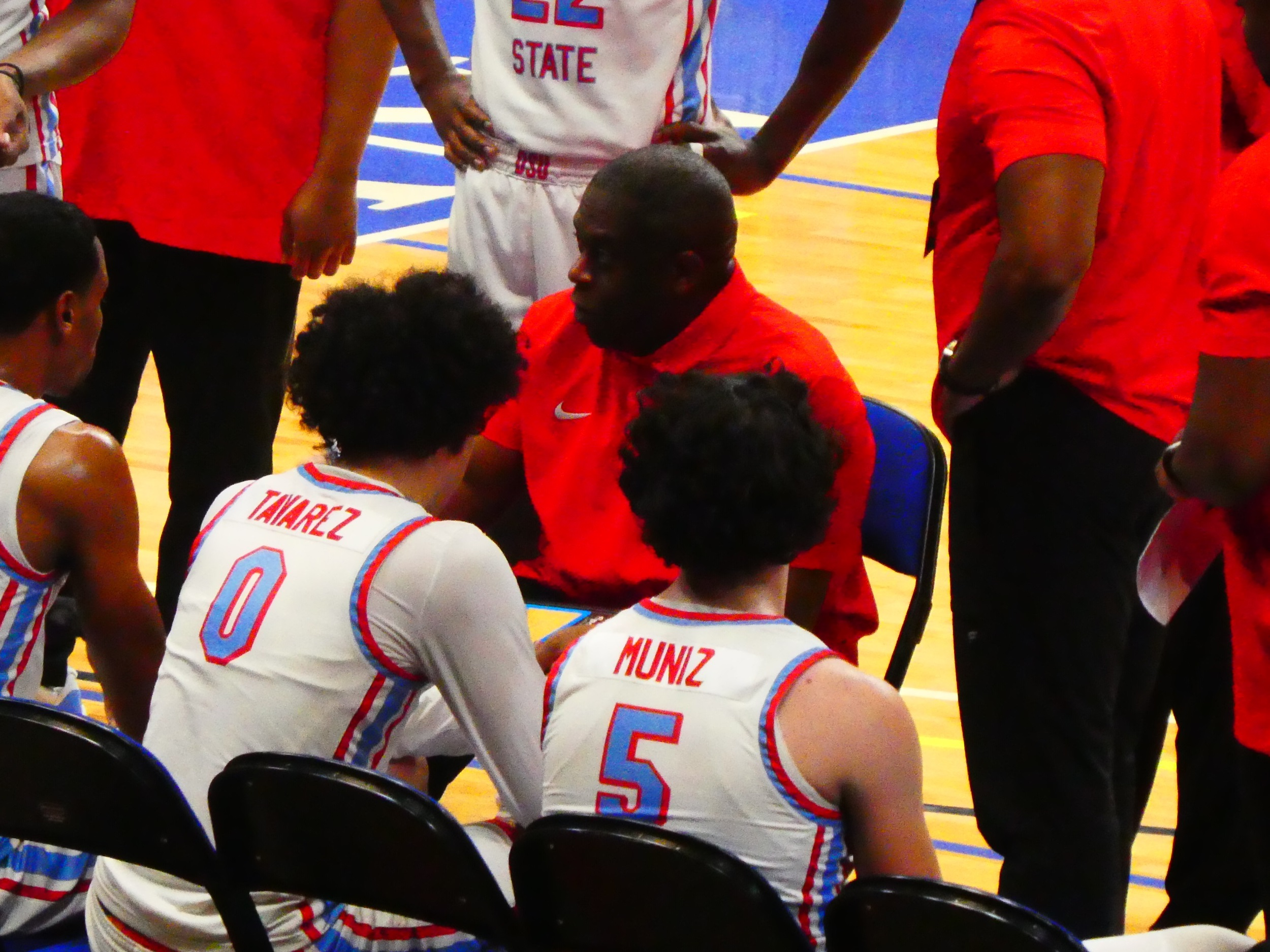
- Waterman at Delaware State in 2024

Current position
- Title: Head coach
- Team: Delaware State
- Conference: MEAC
- Record: 47–106 (.307)

Biographical details
- Born: May 20, 1966 (age 60); Wilmington, Delaware, U.S.

Playing career
- 1984–1989: Delaware

Coaching career (HC unless noted)
- 1989–1990: Wilmington (assistant)
- 1990–1991: Sanford School (assistant)
- 1991–2021: Sanford School
- 2021–present: Delaware State

Head coaching record
- Overall: 47–106 (.307)
- Tournaments: 0–1 (CBI)

Stan Waterman (born May 20, 1966) is an American college basketball coach who is the current head coach of the Delaware State Hornets men's basketball program.

== Early life and education ==
Waterman grew up in Wilmington, Delaware and attended Howard Career Center High School. Playing point guard, he was named Second Team All-State as a senior and earned an invitation to the Delaware High School All-Star Basketball Game. Waterman led the team to the state championship game in 1981 and the state semifinals in 1983. He received a scholarship to Delaware. Waterman sat out the 1985–86 season to focus on his studies. He made his first career start in February 1988 and finished with six points, seven assists, and five rebounds. Waterman earned a degree in sociology in 1988.

== Coaching career ==
=== Sanford School (1991–2021) ===
Following the close of his college career, Waterman pursued a coaching career serving as an assistant coach at Wilmington University during the 1989–90 season. He then became an assistant coach at the Sanford School in Hockessin, Delaware while maintaining a job with Child Protective Services in Wilmington. Waterman was named head coach at the Sanford School in April 1991, after the resignation of Thom Shumosic.

At the Sanford School, Waterman amassed 571 wins and guided the Warriors to 10 state championship game appearances, winning eight state titles (1992, 2002, 2010–12, 2016, 2019, and 2021). His 2020 team reached the state semifinals before the tournament was canceled due to the COVID-19 pandemic. In addition to his coaching role, he served as dean of students and assistant director of Athletics at Sanford.

In 2016, Waterman earned the Tubby Raymond Award as Delaware Coach of the Year by the Delaware Sportswriters and Broadcasters Association after leading Sanford to its sixth state championship.

Waterman was also a part of the USA Basketball coaching staff. He was an assistant coach for the gold medal-winning 2018 USA Men's U17 World Cup Team and the 2017 USA Men's U16 national team. He was also an assistant coach for the 2019 USA Nike Hoop Summit team, which defeated the World Select Team in Portland, Oregon, and was named to the coaching staff for the 2020 Nike Hoop Summit Team (which did not compete due to the COVID-19 pandemic).

=== Delaware State (2021–present) ===
Waterman was announced as the head coach of men's basketball at Delaware State University on June 4, 2021. At the time of his hiring, Hall of Fame Villanova head coach Jay Wright praised Waterman as “an outstanding leader in our game” with “elite basketball knowledge and experience,” calling him a "great choice" to lead the Delaware State program.

The Hornets' win totals increased in each of Waterman's first four seasons as head coach.

==== 2023-24 season ====
In the 2023-24 season, Waterman guided Delaware State to a 15-win campaign, marking a significant turnaround for the program. The Hornets advanced to the championship game of the Mid-Eastern Athletic Conference (MEAC) tournament, their deepest postseason run in years. As a result of their success, the team received an invitation to the College Basketball Invitational Tournament, a 16-team national postseason event, where they were seeded 14th.

== Head coaching record ==
Record table
Season	Team	Overall	Conference	Standing	Postseason
Delaware State Hornets (MEAC) (2021–present)
2021–22	Delaware State	2–26	0–14	8th	
2022–23	Delaware State	6–24	4–10	T–6th	
2023–24	Delaware State	15–19	6–8	6th	CBI First Round
2024–25	Delaware State	16–14	8–6	3rd	
2025–26	Delaware State	8–23	2–12	8th	
2026–27	Delaware State	0–0	0–0		
Delaware State:		47–106 (.307)	20–50 (.286)		
Total:		47–106 (.307)			
National champion Postseason invitational champion Conference regular season champion Conference regular season and conference tournament champion Division regular season champion Division regular season and conference tournament champion Conference tournament champion

== Personal life ==
Waterman and his wife Robyn have one daughter, named Paris Waterman-Dupree.
