= Cleo Hill Jr. =

American basketball player and coach (born 1966)

Current position
- Title: Head coach
- Team: Maryland Eastern Shore
- Conference: MEAC
- Record: 14–39 (.264)

Biographical details
- Born: September 20, 1966 (age 60)

Playing career
- 1984–1988: North Carolina Central
- 1990–1991: Swan Hill Flyers

Coaching career (HC unless noted)
- 1991–1994: Orange HS (assistant)
- 1994–1996: Elizabeth HS (assistant)
- 1996–1998: Mount Zion Christian Academy (assistant)
- 1998–2000: Nebraska (assistant)
- 2000–2002: Shaw (assistant)
- 2003–2008: Cheyney
- 2008–2015: Shaw
- 2018–2024: Winston-Salem State
- 2024–present: Maryland Eastern Shore

Head coaching record
- Overall: 14–39 (.264)

Cleo Geoffrey Hill Jr. (born September 20, 1966) is an American basketball coach who is the current head coach of the Maryland Eastern Shore Hawks men's basketball team. He played college basketball for the North Carolina Central Eagles and has previously coached at the collegiate level for the Nebraska Cornhuskers, Shaw Bears, Cheyney Wolves and Winston-Salem State Rams.

== Early life ==
Hill was born on September 20, 1966, the son of Cleo Hill, who was a star basketball player for the Winston-Salem State Rams (1957–1961) and was a first-round NBA draft pick in 1961. Raised in Orange, New Jersey, he attended Orange High School, graduating in 1984. He became a starter on the basketball team as a sophomore, and started every game thereafter. As a junior, he helped the school reach the state championship, and as a senior, he became the third player in Orange history with 1,000 career points. Among the honors he received in high school were selection to the All-State, All-County and All-City teams; he still ranks in the top ten in school scoring history as of 2024 and is an inductee to the school's hall of fame.

Hill played college basketball for the North Carolina Central Eagles from 1984 to 1988. He led the team in scoring as a freshman and was the second-leading scorer as a senior, as the team had a top ranking nationally with an appearance in the NCAA Division II tournament. He won South Atlantic Region All-Tournament honors that year and scored over 1,000 points in his collegiate career, among the best totals in school history. He also served as team captain.

After his collegiate career, Hill played in Australia for the Swan Hill Flyers of the Country Victorian Invitational Basketball League (CVIBL). He was a member of the team during the 1990 and 1991 seasons, having an average of 32 points per game in 1990 and 41 points per game in 1991. He was a CVIBL All-Star and was the most valuable player of the all-star game with 24 points, 19 assists and 10 rebounds.

== Coaching career ==
Hill entered coaching in 1991, serving until 1994 as an assistant for Orange High School. He then worked with Elizabeth High School from 1994 to 1996 before joining the staff of Mount Zion Christian Academy for the 1996–97 season. He served two years there and helped the team compile a record of 52–7 with him as an assistant. Among the players he coached there was future Naismith Memorial Basketball Hall of Fame inductee Tracy McGrady, and one of the teams he helped coach went 26–3 with a number one ranking nationally.

Hill was hired as an assistant coach for the Nebraska Cornhuskers in 1998, helping the team reach the National Invitation Tournament (NIT) while serving two years with the school. He then assisted for the Shaw Bears from 2000 to 2002, helping them win a Central Intercollegiate Athletic Association (CIAA) title while reaching the Final Four in the NCAA Division II tournament. In 2003, he was appointed the head coach of the Cheyney Wolves, where he coached until 2008 and won a division championship in his first year.

Hill returned to Shaw in 2008, being named head coach. In seven years with the Bears, he compiled an overall record of 116–67, which included the 2011–12 season when they finished fifth nationally, went 27–4 overall, won the CIAA crown with a 16–0 mark and reached the NCAA tournament. He was named the NSAA/NCAA DII Clarence Big House Gaines Coach of the Year and BOXTOROW Coach of the Year for the 2010–11 season and was the CIAA Coach of the Year and BOXTOROW Coach of the Year for the 2011–12 season.

Hill worked three years as a trainer after his stint at Shaw. In May 2018, he returned to coaching, being named the head of the Winston-Salem State Rams, where his father had begun his career over 60 years earlier. In his second season, the team went 19–10 and won the CIAA championship, with Hill being named the conference coach of the year. After the 2020–21 season was canceled due to the COVID-19 pandemic, he helped the team win the division title in 2021–22, then helped them win the CIAA tournament and reach the NCAA Division II tournament in 2022–23, followed by a 19–9 record during 2023–24.

On June 1, 2024, Hill was announced as the head coach of the Maryland Eastern Shore Hawks.

== Head coaching record ==
=== NCAA Division I ===
Record table
Season	Team	Overall	Conference	Standing	Postseason
Maryland Eastern Shore Hawks (MEAC) (2024–present)
2024–25	Maryland Eastern Shore	6–25	2–12	8th	
2025–26	Maryland Eastern Shore	9–23	5–9	T–6th	
Maryland Eastern Shore:		15–48 (.238)	7–21 (.250)		
Total:		15–48 (.238)			
National champion Postseason invitational champion Conference regular season champion Conference regular season and conference tournament champion Division regular season champion Division regular season and conference tournament champion Conference tournament champion
