= Howard Bison men's basketball =

Basketball team that represents Howard University

Howard Bison
2025–26 Howard Bison men's basketball team
- University: Howard University
- Head coach: Kenny Blakeney (7th season)
- Location: Washington, D.C.
- Arena: Burr Gymnasium (capacity: 2,700)
- Conference: MEAC
- Nickname: Bison
- Colors: Navy blue and white

NCAA Division I tournament appearances
- 1981, 1992, 2023, 2024, 2026

Conference tournament champions
- 1980, 1981, 1992, 2023, 2024, 2026

Conference regular-season champions
- 1980, 1983, 1987, 1992, 2023, 2026

The Howard Bison men's basketball team is the basketball team that represents Howard University in Washington, D.C., United States. The school's team currently competes in the Mid-Eastern Athletic Conference. The Bison have appeared five times in the NCAA tournament, most recently in 2026. The head coach of the Bison is Kenny Blakeney.

== History ==
Howard joined NCAA Division I men's basketball for the 1973-74 season, as members of the Mid-Eastern Athletic Conference (MEAC). As of 2026, the Bison are still members of the MEAC.

The Bison made their first NCAA tournament appearance in 1981, falling to Wyoming 78-43 in the first round held at Pauley Pavilion in Los Angeles, California. The 1981 team was led by head coach A.B. Williamson.

After 11 years without a tourney bid, Howard returned to the NCAA tournament in 1992 under head coach Butch Beard. In the 1992 NCAA tournament the Bison lost to #1 Kansas 100-67.

In summer 2020, the university received a commitment from Makur Maker, a five-star recruit out of Arizona and cousin of NBA players Thon and Matur Maker. It was the first successful recruitment of a major NBA prospect to an HBCU in the modern era, and Maker spoke of it as an attempt to "change the culture", namely that of recruits looking only to Power Five schools as their path to the pros. Maker would only play in two games for the Bison in his freshman season, however, due to injury.

In February 2021, the Bison would cancel the remainder of their season due to ongoing medical issues stemming from COVID-19.

In 2023, Howard ended a 21 year NCAA tournament drought with an appearance in the 2023 NCAA tournament. Head coach Kenneth Blakeney led the Bison to 2023 MEAC regular season and tournament titles. As a #16 seed they lost to #1 Kansas 96-68.

In 2024, the Bison made back-to-back NCAA tournament appearances. Howard lost to #16 Wagner in the NCAA First Four. In 2026, Howard was MEAC regular season and tournament champions and returned to the NCAA tournament for a third time in four years. The Bison earned the program's first NCAA tournament win in the NCAA First Four over #16 UMBC 86-83.

== Postseason results ==
=== NCAA tournament results ===
The Bison have appeared in the NCAA tournament five times. Their combined record is 1–5.

Year	Seed	Round	Opponent	Result
1981	#12	Round of 48	#5 Wyoming	L 43–78
1992	#16	Round of 64	#1 Kansas	L 67–100
2023	#16	First Round	#1 Kansas	L 68–96
2024	#16	First Four	#16 Wagner	L 68–71
2026	#16	First Four; First Round	#16 UMBC #1 Michigan	W 86–83; L 80–101

=== CBI results ===
The Bison have appeared in the College Basketball Invitational (CBI) once. Their record is 0–1.

Year	Round	Opponent	Result
2019	First Round	Coastal Carolina	L 72–81
