= Delaware State Hornets men's basketball =

2026–27 Delaware State Hornets men's basketball team
- University: Delaware State University
- Head coach: Stan Waterman (6th season)
- Location: Dover, Delaware
- Arena: Memorial Hall (capacity: 1,800)
- Conference: MEAC
- Nickname: Hornets
- Colors: Columbia blue and red

NCAA Division I tournament appearances
- 2005

Conference tournament champions
- 2005

Conference regular-season champions
- 2005, 2006, 2007

The Delaware State Hornets men's basketball team is the basketball team that represents Delaware State University in Dover, Delaware, United States. The school's team currently competes in the Mid-Eastern Athletic Conference. They are coached by Stan Waterman, who was hired as head coach in 2021.

== Postseason results ==
=== NCAA tournament results ===
The Hornets have appeared in the NCAA tournament one time. Their record is 0–1.

Year	Round	Opponent	Result
2005	First Round	Duke	L 46–57

=== NIT results ===
The Hornets have appeared in the National Invitation Tournament (NIT) two times. Their combined record is 1–2.

Year	Round	Opponent	Result
2006	Opening Round; First Round	Northern Arizona; Louisville	W 58–53; L 54–71
2007	First Round	West Virginia	L 50–74

=== CBI results ===
The Hornets have appeared in the College Basketball Invitational (CBI) one time. Their record is 0–1.

Year	Round	Opponent	Result
2015	First Round	Radford	L 57–78
