= Bryce Harris (basketball) =

American basketball player (born 2002)

No. 34 – Rio Grande Valley Vipers
- Position: Shooting guard
- League: NBA G League

Personal information
- Born: May 2, 2002 (age 24) Brentwood, New York, U.S.
- Listed height: 6 ft 4 in (1.93 m)
- Listed weight: 220 lb (100 kg)

Career information
- High school: Brentwood (Brentwood, New York); Greensboro Day School (Greensboro, North Carolina)
- College: Howard (2021–2026)
- NBA draft: 2026: undrafted
- Playing career: 2026–present

Career history
- 2026–present: Rio Grande Valley Vipers

Career highlights
- MEAC Player of the Year (2026); MEAC Tournament MVP (2026); 2× First-team All-MEAC (2024, 2026); All-MEAC Defensive team (2026)
- Stats at NBA.com
- Stats at Basketball Reference

Bryce Harris (born May 2, 2002) is an American professional basketball player for the Rio Grande Valley Vipers of the NBA G League. He played college basketball for the Howard Bison.

== High school career ==
Harris attended Brentwood High School. As a junior, he averaged 13 points and seven rebounds per game and earned NCISAA 4A all-state honors. For his senior season, Harris transferred to Greensboro Day School. He committed to play college basketball at Howard.

== College career ==
He helped Howard reach the NCAA Tournament as a sophomore and averaged 7.0 points per game. As a junior, Harris averaged 16.6 points and 7.6 rebounds per game, earning First Team All-MEAC honors. He averaged 9.6 points and 6.1 rebounds per game in seven games before a foot injury cut his senior season short. As a fifth-year senior, Harris averaged 17.3 points, 6.9 rebounds and 2.5 assists per game. He was named MEAC Player of the Year.

== Professional career ==
After going undrafted in the 2026 NBA draft, Harris joined the Oklahoma City Thunder for NBA Summer League play. He signed with the Houston Rockets but was waived on October 18.
