= Maryland Eastern Shore Hawks men's basketball =

American college basketball team

| 2025–26 Maryland Eastern Shore Hawks men's basketball team |
- University: University of Maryland Eastern Shore
- Head coach: Cleo Hill Jr. (2nd season)
- Location: Princess Anne, Maryland
- Arena: Hytche Athletic Center (capacity: 5,500)
- Conference: MEAC
- Nickname: Hawks
- Colors: Maroon and gray

NAIA tournament appearances
- 1956, 1960, 1961, 1962, 1964, 1969, 1970, 1973

Conference tournament champions
- 1965, 1974

Conference regular-season champions
- 1956, 1960, 1961, 1962, 1965, 1970, 1973, 1974

The Maryland Eastern Shore Hawks men's basketball team is the basketball team that represents University of Maryland Eastern Shore in Princess Anne, Maryland, United States.

== History ==
UMES is the only HBCU men's basketball team to have ever been ranked in the men's AP top 25 poll, coming in at number 20 in the 1973–74 season after winning their first 20 games.

The school's team currently competes in the Mid-Eastern Athletic Conference. They have never played in the NCAA Division I men's basketball tournament. The Hawks are led by head coach Cleo Hill Jr.

== Postseason results ==
=== National Invitation Tournament results ===
The Hawks have appeared in the National Invitation Tournament one time. Their record is 1–1.

| Year | Round | Opponent | Result |
|---|---|---|---|
| 1974 | First Round; Quarterfinals | Manhattan; Jacksonville | W 84–81; L 83–85 |

=== CollegeInsider.com Postseason Tournament results ===
The Hawks have appeared in the CollegeInsider.com Postseason Tournament one time. Their record is 0–1.

| Year | Round | Opponent | Result |
|---|---|---|---|
| 2015 | First Round | High Point | L 64–70 |

=== The Basketball Classic results ===
The Hawks have appeared in The Basketball Classic one time. Their record is 0–1.

| Year | Round | Opponent | Result |
|---|---|---|---|
| 2022 | First Round | Coastal Carolina | L 42-66 |

=== NAIA tournament results ===
The Hawks have appeared in the NAIA Tournament seven times. Their combined record is 10–7.

| Year | Round | Opponent | Result |
|---|---|---|---|
| 1956 | District Semi-Final | Jackson State | L 81–85 |
| 1960 | District Semi-Final | Albany | W 73–55 |
| 1960 | District Final | Montclair | W 84–59 |
| 1960 | Nationals First Round | Westminster | L 63–64 |
| 1961 | District Semi-Final | Albany | W 69–53 |
| 1961 | District Final | Pratt State | W 76–68 |
| 1961 | First Round | Missouri Valley | L 74–89 |
| 1961 | District Semi-Final | Bloomfield | W 78–72 |
| 1965 | District Semi-Final | New Jersey City | L 54–55 |
| 1965 | First Round | Benedictine College | L 73–75 |
| 1969 | First Round; Second Round; Quarterfinals; Semifinals; National Championship Game | Wartburg; Wisconsin–Stout; Monmouth; Central Washington; Eastern New Mexico | W 99–90; W 85–83; W 99–94; W 93–87; L 76–99 |
| 1970 | First Round; Second Round; Quarterfinals | California (PA); Morris Harvey; Eastern New Mexico | W 101–67; W 88–78; L 74–76 ^{OT} |
| 1972 | First Round | Xavier (LA) | L 80–102 |
| 1973 | First Round; Second Round; Quarterfinals; Semifinals; National Championship Game | Montana State–Billings; Ferris State; Xavier (LA); Slippery Rock; Guilford | W 114–107; W 95–90; W 87–80; W 113–82; L 96–99 |
