= CBS Sports Classic =

American men's college basketball event

The CBS Sports Classic is an annual American men's college basketball event that began in 2014.

Four teams take part annually in the event. From the inception of the classic through 2024, Kentucky, North Carolina, Ohio State, and UCLA each participated. Each team played one game each year (except for 2021 due to Covid cancellations), with the four teams completing a double-header. Both games are annually broadcast on U.S. television on CBS, the Classic's namesake.

On July 21, 2022, the CBS Sports Classic was renewed through 2026.

For the 2024–25 season, CBS Sports launched the CBS Sports Classic: HBCU Showcase featuring North Carolina A&T, North Carolina Central, Hampton and Howard.

In 2025, UCLA pulled out of the Classic due to travel concerns. They were replaced by St. John's.

On January 28, 2026 it was announced that with Kentucky, North Carolina, & Ohio State that Kansas would be joining the event through 2029 with the future dates & games.

== Game results ==
Date	Location	Winning team		Losing team		Attendance
December 20, 2014	United Center (Chicago, Illinois)	No. 24 North Carolina	82	No. 12 Ohio State	74	19,726
December 20, 2014	United Center (Chicago, Illinois)	No. 1 Kentucky	83	UCLA	44	19,726
December 19, 2015	Barclays Center (Brooklyn, New York City, New York)	No. 11 North Carolina	89	No. 22 UCLA	76	16,311
December 19, 2015	Barclays Center (Brooklyn, New York City, New York)	Ohio State	74	No. 4 Kentucky	67	16,311
December 17, 2016	T-Mobile Arena (Las Vegas, Nevada)	No. 2 UCLA	86	Ohio State	73	19,298
December 17, 2016	T-Mobile Arena (Las Vegas, Nevada)	No. 6 Kentucky	103	No. 7 North Carolina	100	19,298
December 23, 2017	Smoothie King Center (New Orleans, Louisiana)	No. 5 North Carolina	86	Ohio State	72	8,119
December 23, 2017	Smoothie King Center (New Orleans, Louisiana)	UCLA	83	No. 7 Kentucky	75	8,119
December 22, 2018	United Center (Chicago, Illinois)	No. 15 Ohio State	80	UCLA	66	19,726
December 22, 2018	United Center (Chicago, Illinois)	No. 19 Kentucky	80	No. 9 North Carolina	72	19,726
December 21, 2019	T-Mobile Arena (Las Vegas, Nevada)	North Carolina	74	UCLA	64	12,740
December 21, 2019	T-Mobile Arena (Las Vegas, Nevada)	No. 5 Ohio State	71	No. 6 Kentucky	65	12,740
December 19, 2020	Rocket Mortgage FieldHouse (Cleveland, Ohio)	No. 22 North Carolina	75	Kentucky	63	0^{a}
December 19, 2020	Rocket Mortgage FieldHouse (Cleveland, Ohio)	No. 20 Ohio State	77	UCLA	70	0^{a}
December 18, 2021	T-Mobile Arena (Las Vegas, Nevada)	North Carolina		No. 4 UCLA		Canceled^{b}
December 18, 2021	T-Mobile Arena (Las Vegas, Nevada)	No. 15 Ohio State		No. 21 Kentucky		Canceled^{c}
December 18, 2021	T-Mobile Arena (Las Vegas, Nevada)	No. 21 Kentucky	98	North Carolina	69	12,117^{d}
December 17, 2022	Madison Square Garden (New York, NY)	North Carolina	89	No. 23 Ohio State	84	20,261
December 17, 2022	Madison Square Garden (New York, NY)	No. 16 UCLA	63	No. 13 Kentucky	53	20,261
December 16, 2023	State Farm Arena (Atlanta, GA)	Ohio State	67	UCLA	60	17,058
December 16, 2023	State Farm Arena (Atlanta, GA)	No. 14 Kentucky	87	No. 9 North Carolina	83	17,058
December 21, 2024	Madison Square Garden (New York, NY)	Ohio State	85	No. 4 Kentucky	65	19,812
December 21, 2024	Madison Square Garden (New York, NY)	North Carolina	76	No. 18 UCLA	74	19,812
December 28, 2024	Corbett Sports Center (Greensboro, NC)	North Carolina A&T	85	North Carolina Central	72	4,011
December 28, 2024	Hampton Convocation Center (Hampton, VA)	Hampton	83	Howard	67	4,213
December 20, 2025	State Farm Arena (Atlanta, GA)	Kentucky	78	No. 22 St. John's	66	16,951
December 20, 2025	State Farm Arena (Atlanta, GA)	No. 12 North Carolina	71	Ohio State	70	16,951
December 19, 2026	Madison Square Garden (New York, NY)	Kansas vs. Ohio State				
December 19, 2026	Madison Square Garden (New York, NY)	North Carolina vs. Kentucky				
December 18, 2027	TBA	Kentucky vs. Ohio State				
December 18, 2027	TBA	Kansas vs. North Carolina				
December 16, 2028	TBA	Kansas vs. Kentucky				
December 16, 2028	TBA	North Carlina vs. Ohio State				
December 15, 2029	TBA	Ohio State vs. Kansas				
December 15, 2029	TBA	Kentucky vs. North Carolina				

- ^{a} No attendance due to COVID-19 pandemic.
- ^{b} Canceled due to COVID-19 issues at UCLA.
- ^{c} Canceled due to COVID-19 issues at Ohio State.
- ^{d} Due to UCLA and Ohio State missing the CBS Sports Classic in 2021, CBS, Kentucky, and North Carolina reached an agreement for the remaining teams to play.

== Head-to-head records ==
	Kentucky	North Carolina	Ohio State	UCLA	St. John's	Kansas
vs. Kentucky	–	1–4	3–0	2–1	0–1	–
vs. North Carolina	4–1	–	0–4	0–3	0–0	–
vs. Ohio State	0–3	4–0	–	1–3	0–0	–
vs. UCLA	1–2	3–0	3–1	–	0–0	–
vs. St. John's	1–0	0–0	0–0	0–0	–	–
Total	6–6	8–4	6–5	3–7	0–1	
Percentage	.500	.666	.545	.300	.000	
