= 2024–25 Maryland Eastern Shore Hawks men's basketball team =

American college basketball season

2024–25 Maryland Eastern Shore Hawks men's basketball
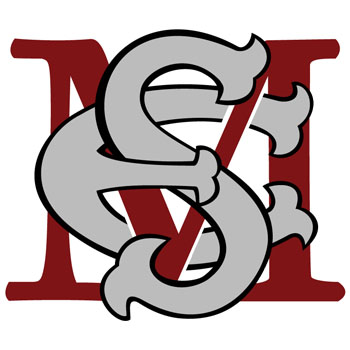
- Conference: Mid-Eastern Athletic Conference
- Record: 6–25 (2–12 MEAC)
- Head coach: Cleo Hill Jr. (1st season)
- Assistant coaches: Lance Beckwith; Chuck Ellis; Delorian Heard
- Home arena: Hytche Athletic Center

2024–25 MEAC men's basketball standings
	Conf.				Overall
Team	W		L	PCT	W		L	PCT
Norfolk State †	11	–	3	.786	24	–	11	.686
South Carolina State	11	–	3	.786	20	–	13	.606
Delaware State	8	–	6	.571	16	–	14	.533
Howard	7	–	7	.500	12	–	20	.375
Morgan State	7	–	7	.500	14	–	18	.438
North Carolina Central	6	–	8	.429	14	–	19	.424
Coppin State	4	–	10	.286	6	–	24	.200
Maryland Eastern Shore	2	–	12	.143	6	–	25	.194
† 2025 MEAC tournament winner

The 2024–25 Maryland Eastern Shore Hawks men's basketball team represented the University of Maryland Eastern Shore during the 2024–25 NCAA Division I men's basketball season. The Hawks, led by first-year head coach Cleo Hill Jr., played their home games at the Hytche Athletic Center in Princess Anne, Maryland as members of the Mid-Eastern Athletic Conference (MEAC).

== Previous season ==
The Hawks finished the 2023–24 season 9–20, 4–10 in MEAC play, to finish in seventh place. They were defeated by North Carolina Central in the quarterfinals of the MEAC tournament. On May 8, 2024, it was announced that head coach Jason Crafton would be relieved of his duties, ending his five-year tenure with the team. On June 1, the school announced the hiring of Winston-Salem State head coach Cleo Hill Jr. as the team's next head coach.

== Roster ==
2024–25 Maryland Eastern Shore Hawks men's basketball team
Players
Coaches

Pos.	#	Name	Height	Weight	Year	Previous school	Hometown
G	0	Ketron "KC" Shaw	6 ft 5 in (1.96 m)	190 lb (86 kg)	Jr	Winston-Salem State	Charlotte, NC
G/F	1	Ralph Martino Jr.	6 ft 6 in (1.98 m)	180 lb (82 kg)	Fr	Overtime Elite	Lanham, MD
PG	2	Hassan Perkins	6 ft 0 in (1.83 m)	175 lb (79 kg)	Jr	Hagerstown CC	Wilmington, DE
PG	3	Evan Johnson	6 ft 0 in (1.83 m)	165 lb (75 kg)	GS	Georgia State	Durham, NC
G	4	Kyrell Shaw	6 ft 4 in (1.93 m)	165 lb (75 kg)	Fr	Northside Christian Academy	Charlotte, NC
G	5	Cardell Bailey	6 ft 6 in (1.98 m)	195 lb (88 kg)	Jr	Navarro College	Detroit, MI
G	10	Jose Cuello	6 ft 1 in (1.85 m)	185 lb (84 kg)	Jr	College of the Sequoias	Harlem, NY
G	11	Jaiden Lee	6 ft 6 in (1.98 m)	195 lb (88 kg)	Jr	Baton Rouge CC	Chicago, IL
F	21	Lawrence Foreman	6 ft 9 in (2.06 m)	240 lb (109 kg)	GS	St. Thomas Aquinas	Kingston, Jamaica
F	22	Maurice Vassel	6 ft 9 in (2.06 m)	195 lb (88 kg)	Fr	St. Benedict's Prep	Brooklyn, NY
F	23	Trey Hall	6 ft 9 in (2.06 m)	215 lb (98 kg)	Sr	Utah Tech	Willimantic, CT
F	24	Jalen Ware	6 ft 8 in (2.03 m)	195 lb (88 kg)	GS	Austin Peay	Winston-Salem, NC
PF	35	Christopher Flippin	6 ft 8 in (2.03 m)	240 lb (109 kg)	Jr	Highland CC	Metairie, LA

Head coach

- Cleo Hill Jr. (North Carolina Central)

Assistant coach(es)

- Lance Beckwith (Central Missouri)
- Chuck Ellis (Cheyney)
- Delorian Heard (Redlands)

Legend

- (C) Team captain
- (S) Suspended
- (I) Ineligible
- (W) Walk-on
- Injured
- Current redshirt

Roster
Last update: November 21, 2024

== Schedule and results ==
Date time, TV	Rank^{#}	Opponent^{#}	Result	Record	Site (attendance) city, state
Non-conference regular season
November 4, 2024*; 7:00 p.m., SECN+/ESPN+		at Vanderbilt	L 63–102	0–1	Memorial Gymnasium (5,011); Nashville, TN
November 7, 2024*; 7:00 p.m., ESPN+		at Penn	L 84–87	0–2	The Palestra (932); Philadelphia, PA
November 9, 2024*; 4:00 p.m.		Penn State Schuylkill	W 96–77	1–2	Hytche Athletic Center (1,000); Princess Anne, MD
November 12, 2024*; 7:00 p.m., ESPN+		at Miami (OH)	L 70–88	1–3	Millett Hall (1,611); Oxford, OH
November 15, 2024*; 7:00 p.m., ESPN+		at Old Dominion	L 71–73	1–4	Chartway Arena (5,300); Norfolk, VA
November 18, 2024*; 7:00 p.m.		Gallaudet	W 113–58	2–4	Hytche Athletic Center (784); Princess Anne, MD
November 20, 2024*; 8:00 p.m., ESPN+		at Murray State	L 61–79	2–5	CFSB Center (4,731); Murray, KY
November 23, 2024*; 4:00 p.m., B1G+		at No. 25 Illinois; Turkey Throwdown	L 40–87	2–6	State Farm Center (13,456); Champaign, IL
November 25, 2024*; 8:00 p.m., SECN+/ESPN+		at No. 19 Arkansas; Turkey Throwdown	L 35–109	2–7	Bud Walton Arena (19,200); Fayetteville, AR
November 27, 2024*; 7:00 p.m., ESPN+		at Little Rock; Turkey Throwdown	L 59–78	2–8	Jack Stephens Center (865); Little Rock, AR
November 30, 2024*; 7:00 p.m., Peacock		at No. 2 UConn	L 45–99	2–9	XL Center (15,684); Hartford, CT
December 5, 2024*; 7:00 p.m., ESPN+		at Longwood	L 76–80	2–10	Joan Perry Brock Center; Farmville, VA
December 8, 2024*; 1:00 p.m., DSN		Wagner	L 61–63	2–11	Hytche Athletic Center (100); Princess Anne, MD
December 14, 2024*; 4:00 p.m., DSN		Bryn Athyn	W 91–65	3–11	Hytche Athletic Center (386); Princess Anne, MD
December 16, 2024*; 7:00 p.m.		Cairn	W 81–64	4–11	Hytche Athletic Center (218); Princess Anne, MD
December 28, 2024*; 12:00 p.m., BTN		at Maryland	L 66–81	4–12	Xfinity Center (11,058); College Park, MD
MEAC regular season
January 4, 2025; 4:00 p.m.		at Norfolk State	L 59–81	4–13 (0–1)	Joseph G. Echols Memorial Hall (2,436); Norfolk, VA
January 11, 2025; 4:00 p.m., ESPN+		at North Carolina Central	L 66–88	4–14 (0–2)	McDougald–McLendon Arena (1,328); Durham, NC
January 13, 2025; 7:30 p.m.		at South Carolina State	L 64–78	4–15 (0–3)	SHM Memorial Center (486); Orangeburg, SC
January 25, 2025; 4:00 p.m.		Delaware State	L 66–73	4–16 (0–4)	Hytche Athletic Center (401); Princess Anne, MD
February 1, 2025; 4:00 p.m.		at Morgan State	L 63–76	4–17 (0–5)	Hill Field House (1,657); Baltimore, MD
February 3, 2025; 8:00 p.m.		Coppin State	L 57–62	4–18 (0–6)	Hytche Athletic Center (761); Princess Anne, MD
February 10, 2025; 8:00 p.m.		Howard	L 57–77	4–19 (0–7)	Hytche Athletic Center (734); Princess Anne, MD
February 15, 2025; 4:00 p.m.		Norfolk State	L 63–75	4–20 (0–8)	Hytche Athletic Center (842); Princess Anne, MD
February 17, 2025; 7:30 p.m., ESPN+		at Howard	L 62–86	4–21 (0–9)	Burr Gymnasium (1,328); Washington, D.C.
February 24, 2025; 8:00 p.m.		South Carolina State	L 68–81	4–22 (0–10)	Hytche Athletic Center (650); Princess Anne, MD
February 26, 2025; 8:00 p.m.		North Carolina Central	W 68–59	5–22 (1–10)	Hytche Athletic Center (501); Princess Anne, MD
March 1, 2025; 4:00 p.m.		Morgan State	L 72–75	5–23 (1–11)	Hytche Athletic Center (570); Princess Anne, MD
March 3, 2025; 7:30 p.m., ESPN+		at Coppin State	W 72–59	6–23 (2–11)	Physical Education Complex (331); Baltimore, MD
March 6, 2025; 7:30 p.m., ESPN+		at Delaware State	L 68–75	6–24 (2–12)	Memorial Hall (302); Dover, DE
MEAC tournament
March 12, 2025; 6:00 p.m., ESPN+	(8)	vs. (1) Norfolk State; Quarterfinals	L 70–77	6–25	Norfolk Scope; Norfolk, VA
*Non-conference game. ^{#}Rankings from AP poll. (#) Tournament seedings in parentheses. All times are in Eastern.
