= 2024–25 Morgan State Bears basketball team =

American college basketball season

2024–25 Morgan State Bears basketball
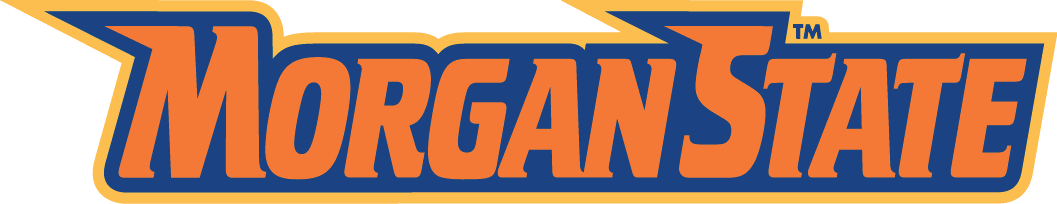
- Conference: Mid-Eastern Athletic Conference
- Record: 14–18 (7–7 MEAC)
- Head coach: Kevin Broadus (6th season)
- Assistant coaches: Chretien Lukusa; Keith Goodie; Austin Freeman; Keith Coutreyer
- Home arena: Hill Field House

2024–25 MEAC men's basketball standings
	Conf.				Overall
Team	W		L	PCT	W		L	PCT
Norfolk State †	11	–	3	.786	24	–	11	.686
South Carolina State	11	–	3	.786	20	–	13	.606
Delaware State	8	–	6	.571	16	–	14	.533
Howard	7	–	7	.500	12	–	20	.375
Morgan State	7	–	7	.500	14	–	18	.438
North Carolina Central	6	–	8	.429	14	–	19	.424
Coppin State	4	–	10	.286	6	–	24	.200
Maryland Eastern Shore	2	–	12	.143	6	–	25	.194
† 2025 MEAC tournament winner

The 2024–25 Morgan State Bears basketball team represented Morgan State University during the 2024–25 NCAA Division I men's basketball season. The Bears, led by sixth-year head coach Kevin Broadus, played their home games at Hill Field House in Baltimore, Maryland as members of the Mid-Eastern Athletic Conference.

== Previous season ==
The Bears finished the 2023–24 season 11–20, 7–7 in MEAC play to finish in fifth place. They were defeated by eventual tournament champions Howard in the quarterfinals of the MEAC tournament.

== Roster ==
2024–25 Morgan State Bears men's basketball team
Players
Coaches

Pos.	#	Name	Height	Weight	Year	Previous school	Hometown
G	0	Kameron Hobbs	5 ft 10 in (1.78 m)	170 lb (77 kg)	RS Sr	North Greenville	Stockbridge, Georgia
G	1	Wynston Tabbs	6 ft 3 in (1.91 m)	195 lb (88 kg)	GS	East Carolina	Suitland, Maryland
G	2	Demajion Topps	6 ft 0 in (1.83 m)	175 lb (79 kg)	RS Jr	Bishop State CC	Winona, Mississippi
G	3	Rob Lawson	6 ft 0 in (1.83 m)	175 lb (79 kg)	Jr	National Christian Academy	Capitol Heights, Maryland
G	4	Kiran Oliver	6 ft 5 in (1.96 m)	190 lb (86 kg)	Jr	New Mexico State	Chicago, Illinois
F	5	Matar Wade	6 ft 8 in (2.03 m)	205 lb (93 kg)	Fr	Archbishop Carroll HS	Washington, D.C.
F	7	Marland Harris	6 ft 10 in (2.08 m)	210 lb (95 kg)	Jr	West Los Angeles College	Inglewood, California
F	9	Jaden Martin	6 ft 10 in (2.08 m)	185 lb (84 kg)	Jr	West Broward HS	Hollywood, Florida
F	10	Will Thomas	6 ft 6 in (1.98 m)	200 lb (91 kg)	RS Sr	Mervo HS	Baltimore, Maryland
G	11	Amahrie Simpkins	6 ft 4 in (1.93 m)	190 lb (86 kg)	Sr	Harcum College	Brooklyn, New York
F	12	Daniel Akitoby	6 ft 9 in (2.06 m)	230 lb (104 kg)	Sr	Falls Church HS	Fairfax, Virginia
F	13	Trent Edwards	6 ft 8 in (2.03 m)	210 lb (95 kg)	So	George Rogers Clark HS	Lexington, Kentucky
G	22	Pierce Shirk	6 ft 4 in (1.93 m)	200 lb (91 kg)	So	Georgia Southern	Jacksonville, Florida
G	23	Tytan Newton	6 ft 1 in (1.85 m)	170 lb (77 kg)	RS So	South Plains College	Indianapolis, Indiana
F	24	Logan Schayes	6 ft 8 in (2.03 m)	235 lb (107 kg)	So	Beacon College	Scottsdale, Arizona
F	32	Jayden Socka	6 ft 9 in (2.06 m)	255 lb (116 kg)	Jr	Prince George's CC	Silver Spring, Maryland
F	55	Xavier Valley	6 ft 8 in (2.03 m)	205 lb (93 kg)	Jr	Cowley CC	Atlanta, Georgia

Head coach

- Kevin Broadus (Bowie State)

Assistant coach(es)

- Chretien Lukusa (Binghamton)
- Keith Goodie (Morgan State)
- Austin Freeman (Georgetown)
- Keith Coutreyer (Columbia Union)

Legend

- (C) Team captain
- (S) Suspended
- (I) Ineligible
- (W) Walk-on
- Injured
- Current redshirt

Roster
Last update: November 19, 2024

== Schedule and results ==
Date time, TV	Rank^{#}	Opponent^{#}	Result	Record	Site (attendance) city, state
Non-conference regular season
November 4, 2024*; 7:00 pm		Frostburg State	W 89–76	1–0	Hill Field House (2,648); Baltimore, MD
November 6, 2024*; 6:00 pm		Mercyhurst	L 73–78	1–1	Hill Field House (2,345); Baltimore, MD
November 9, 2024*; 3:00 pm, ESPN+		at Longwood	L 66–84	1–2	Joan Perry Brock Center (3,246); Farmville, VA
November 12, 2024*; 6:00 pm		District of Columbia	W 90–64	2–2	Hill Field House (1,278); Baltimore, MD
November 16, 2024*; 11:00 am		NJIT	W 81–69	3–2	Hill Field House (127); Baltimore, MD
November 20, 2024*; 7:00 pm, FloHoops		at North Carolina A&T	L 83–86	3–3	Corbett Sports Center (2,459); Greensboro, NC
November 22, 2024*; 7:00 pm, ESPN+		at Buffalo	L 73–82	3–4	Alumni Arena (1,557); Amherst, NY
November 24, 2024*; 4:00 pm, ESPN+		Towson	L 60–64	3–5	Hill Field House (687); Baltimore, MD
November 27, 2024*; 12:00 pm, ESPN+		at UMBC	L 69–92	3–6	Chesapeake Employers Insurance Arena (1,062); Catonsville, MD
December 1, 2024*; 2:00 pm		Central Penn	W 123–70	4–6	Hill Field House (296); Baltimore, MD
December 4, 2024*; 6:00 pm		Cheyney	W 124–57	5–6	Hill Field House (256); Baltimore, MD
December 7, 2024*; 2:00 pm, ESPN+		at Bowling Green	L 81–102	5–7	Stroh Center (1,704); Bowling Green, OH
December 10, 2024*; 7:00 pm, CBSSN		at Xavier	L 58–119	5–8	Cintas Center (9,840); Cincinnati, OH
December 15, 2024*; 2:00 pm		Campbell	W 86–76	6–8	Hill Field House (117); Baltimore, MD
December 22, 2024*; 1:00 pm, ESPN+		at No. 3 Iowa State	L 72–99	6–9	Hilton Coliseum (14,267); Ames, IA
December 29, 2024*; 2:00 pm, Peacock		at Minnesota	L 68–90	6–10	Williams Arena (8,107); Minneapolis, MN
MEAC regular season
January 4, 2025; 4:00 pm, ESPN+		South Carolina State	L 72–86	6–11 (0–1)	Hill Field House (112); Baltimore, MD
January 6, 2025; 7:30 pm, ESPN+		North Carolina Central	W 102–98 ^{2OT}	7–11 (1–1)	Hill Field House (78); Baltimore, MD
January 11, 2025; 4:00 pm, ESPN+		at Howard	L 95–100	7–12 (1–2)	Burr Gymnasium (1,023); Washington, D.C.
January 13, 2025; 7:30 pm, ESPN+		Norfolk State	W 78–74	8–12 (2–2)	Hill Field House (323); Baltimore, MD
January 25, 2025; 4:00 pm, ESPN+		Coppin State	W 80–64	9–12 (3–2)	Hill Field House (3,768); Baltimore, MD
February 1, 2025; 4:00 pm, ESPN+		Maryland Eastern Shore	W 76–63	10–12 (4–2)	Hill Field House (1,657); Baltimore, MD
February 3, 2025; 7:30 pm, ESPN+		at Delaware State	L 82–84	10–13 (4–3)	Memorial Hall (304); Dover, DE
February 15, 2025; 4:00 pm		at South Carolina State	L 62–90	10–14 (4–4)	SHM Memorial Center (763); Orangeburg, SC
February 17, 2025; 7:30 pm, ESPN+		at North Carolina Central	W 92–78	11–14 (5–4)	McDougald–McLendon Arena (674); Durham, NC
February 22, 2025; 4:00 pm, ESPN+		Howard	L 81–87	11–15 (5–5)	Hill Field House (4,234); Baltimore, MD
February 24, 2025; 7:30 pm, ESPN+		at Norfolk State	L 60–69	11–16 (5–6)	Joseph G. Echols Memorial Hall (3,787); Norfolk, VA
March 1, 2025; 4:00 pm		at Maryland Eastern Shore	W 75–72	12–16 (6–6)	Hytche Athletic Center (570); Princess Anne, MD
March 3, 2025; 7:30 pm, ESPN+		Delaware State	W 87–81	13–16 (7–6)	Hill Field House (2,567); Baltimore, MD
March 6, 2025; 8:00 pm, ESPN+		at Coppin State	L 75–82 ^{OT}	13–17 (7–7)	Physical Education Complex (730); Baltimore, MD
MEAC tournament
March 13, 2025; 6:00 pm, ESPN+	(5)	vs. (4) Howard; Quarterfinals	W 91–90	14–17	Norfolk Scope; Norfolk, VA
March 14, 2025; 6:00 pm, ESPN+	(5)	vs. (1) Norfolk State; Semifinals	L 55–58	14–18	Norfolk Scope; Norfolk, VA
*Non-conference game. ^{#}Rankings from AP Poll. (#) Tournament seedings in parentheses. All times are in Eastern.
