= 2024–25 Coppin State Eagles men's basketball team =

American college basketball season

2024–25 Coppin State Eagles men's basketball
- Conference: Mid-Eastern Athletic Conference
- Record: 6–24 (4–10 MEAC)
- Head coach: Larry Stewart (2nd season)
- Assistant coaches: Sidney Raikes; Stephen Stewart
- Home arena: Physical Education Complex

2024–25 MEAC men's basketball standings
	Conf.				Overall
Team	W		L	PCT	W		L	PCT
Norfolk State †	11	–	3	.786	24	–	11	.686
South Carolina State	11	–	3	.786	20	–	13	.606
Delaware State	8	–	6	.571	16	–	14	.533
Howard	7	–	7	.500	12	–	20	.375
Morgan State	7	–	7	.500	14	–	18	.438
North Carolina Central	6	–	8	.429	14	–	19	.424
Coppin State	4	–	10	.286	6	–	24	.200
Maryland Eastern Shore	2	–	12	.143	6	–	25	.194
† 2025 MEAC tournament winner

The 2024–25 Coppin State Eagles men's basketball team represented Coppin State University during the 2024–25 NCAA Division I men's basketball season. The Eagles, led by second-year head coach Larry Stewart, played their home games at the Physical Education Complex in Baltimore, Maryland as members of the Mid-Eastern Athletic Conference.

== Previous season ==
The Eagles finished the 2023–24 season 2–27, 1–13 in MEAC play to finish in last place. They were defeated by Norfolk State in the quarterfinals of the MEAC tournament.

== Roster ==
2024–25 Coppin State Eagles men's basketball team
Players
Coaches

Pos.	#	Name	Height	Weight	Year	Previous school	Hometown
G	0	Zahree Harrison	6 ft 0 in (1.83 m)	185 lb (84 kg)	RS Sr	Saint Francis (PA)	Philadelphia, Pennsylvania
G	1	Ryan Archey	6 ft 0 in (1.83 m)	170 lb (77 kg)	So	Gwynn Park High School	Clinton, Maryland
G	2	Toby Nnadozie	6 ft 3 in (1.91 m)	185 lb (84 kg)	Jr	Maryland Eastern Shore	Baltimore, Maryland
G	3	Cam'Ron Brown	5 ft 11 in (1.8 m)	185 lb (84 kg)	Jr	Allegany College of Maryland	Odenton, Maryland
F	4	Khali Horton	6 ft 8 in (2.03 m)	200 lb (91 kg)	So	Keystone Academy	Erie, Pennsylvania
G	5	Cam Liggins	6 ft 5 in (1.96 m)	200 lb (91 kg)	RS So	Ellsworth Community College	Springfield, Missouri
G	6	Julius Ellerbe III	6 ft 7 in (2.01 m)	205 lb (93 kg)	RS Sr	Eastern Michigan	Washington, D.C.
G	7	Aa'Reyon Munir-Jones	6 ft 3 in (1.91 m)	185 lb (84 kg)	So	Hillcrest High School	Chicago, Illinois
G	10	Camaren Sparrow	6 ft 4 in (1.93 m)	185 lb (84 kg)	So	New Town High School	Baltimore, Maryland
G	11	Derrius Ward	6 ft 6 in (1.98 m)	205 lb (93 kg)	RS Sr	Florida Memorial	Philadelphia, Pennsylvania
F	12	Peter Oduro	6 ft 8 in (2.03 m)	230 lb (104 kg)	Jr	George Mason	Gainesville, Virginia
F	13	Jonathan Dunn	6 ft 7 in (2.01 m)	200 lb (91 kg)	So	Austin Peay	Florissant, Missouri
G	15	Macahi Nelson	6 ft 5 in (1.96 m)	185 lb (84 kg)	Jr	American International	Hagerstown, Maryland
G	20	Darius Leonard	6 ft 1 in (1.85 m)	182 lb (83 kg)	Jr	Bard DC Early College	Washington, D.C.
G	21	Car'Ron Brown	6 ft 1 in (1.85 m)	185 lb (84 kg)	Jr	Allegany College of Maryland	Odenton, Maryland

Head coach

- Larry Stewart (Coppin State)

Assistant coach(es)

- Sidney Raikes (Coppin State)
- Stephen Stewart (Coppin State)

Legend

- (C) Team captain
- (S) Suspended
- (I) Ineligible
- (W) Walk-on
- Injured
- Current redshirt

Roster
Last update: November 21, 2024

== Schedule and results ==
Date time, TV	Rank^{#}	Opponent^{#}	Result	Record	Site (attendance) city, state
Non-conference regular season
November 4, 2024*; 8:00 pm, ACCNX/ESPN+		at Wake Forest	L 49–64	0–1	LJVM Coliseum (8,956); Winston-Salem, NC
November 6, 2024*; 7:00 pm, ESPN+		at High Point	L 51–93	0–2	Qubein Center (3,017); High Point, NC
November 9, 2024*; 2:00 pm, ESPN+		Rider	L 53–64	0–3	Physical Education Complex (492); Baltimore, MD
November 11, 2024*; 7:00 pm, ACCNX/ESPN+		at Virginia	L 45–62	0–4	John Paul Jones Arena (13,294); Charlottesville, VA
November 14, 2024*; 7:00 pm, ESPN+		at UMBC	L 67–92	0–5	Chesapeake Employers Insurance Arena (1,284); Catonsville, MD
November 17, 2024*; 2:00 pm, ACCNX/ESPN+		at Miami (FL)	L 63–93	0–6	Watsco Center (5,361); Coral Gables, FL
November 20, 2024*; 7:00 pm, ESPN+		at George Mason	L 55–93	0–7	EagleBank Arena (2,290); Fairfax, VA
November 26, 2024*; 7:00 pm, ESPN+		at Saint Joseph's	L 54–83	0–8	Hagan Arena (1,758); Philadelphia, PA
December 2, 2024*; 7:00 pm, ESPN+		Loyola (MD)	L 57–68	0–9	Physical Education Complex (374); Baltimore, MD
December 4, 2024*; 7:00 pm, NEC Front Row		at Wagner	L 52–65	0–10	Spiro Sports Center (201); Staten Island, NY
December 10, 2024*; 7:00 pm, ACCNX/ESPN+		at NC State	L 56–66	0–11	Reynolds Coliseum (5,500); Raleigh, NC
December 14, 2024*; 12:30 pm, BTN		at Penn State	L 51–99	0–12	Bryce Jordan Center (6,557); University Park, PA
December 21, 2024*; 1:00 pm, ESPN+		Navy	W 68–60	1–12	Physical Education Complex (347); Baltimore, MD
December 28, 2024*; 12:00 pm, FS1		at Georgetown	L 53–83	1–13	Capital One Arena (5,298); Washington, D.C.
MEAC regular season
January 4, 2025; 4:30 pm, ESPN+		North Carolina Central	W 63–61	2–13 (1–0)	Physical Education Complex (411); Baltimore, MD
January 6, 2025; 8:00 pm, ESPN+		South Carolina State	L 77–85	2–14 (1–1)	Physical Education Complex (210); Baltimore, MD
January 11, 2025; 4:00 pm		at Norfolk State	L 69–92	2–15 (1–2)	Joseph G. Echols Memorial Hall (1,978); Norfolk, VA
January 13, 2025; 7:30 pm, ESPN+		at Howard	L 75–90	2–16 (1–3)	Burr Gymnasium; Washington, D.C.
January 16, 2025*; 11:00 am, ESPN+		Cheyney	W 88–62	3–16	Physical Education Complex (928); Baltimore, MD
January 25, 2025; 4:00 pm, ESPN+		at Morgan State	L 64–80	3–17 (1–4)	Hill Field House (3,768); Baltimore, MD
February 1, 2025; 4:30 pm, ESPN+		Delaware State	L 61–84	3–18 (1–5)	Physical Education Complex (778); Baltimore, MD
February 3, 2025; 7:30 pm		at Maryland Eastern Shore	W 62–57	4–18 (2–5)	Hytche Athletic Center (761); Princess Anne, MD
February 15, 2025; 4:00 pm, ESPN+		at North Carolina Central	L 59–71	4–19 (2–6)	McDougald–McLendon Arena (1,244); Durham, NC
February 17, 2025; 7:30 pm		at South Carolina State	L 57–87	4–20 (2–7)	SHM Memorial Center (436); Orangeburg, SC
February 22, 2025; 4:30 pm, ESPN+		Norfolk State	L 63–79	4–21 (2–8)	Physical Education Complex (2,315); Baltimore, MD
February 24, 2025; 8:00 pm, ESPN+		Howard	W 72–61	5–21 (3–8)	Physical Education Complex (388); Baltimore, MD
March 1, 2025; 4:00 pm, ESPN+		at Delaware State	L 79–83	5–22 (3–9)	Memorial Hall (270); Dover, DE
March 3, 2025; 8:00 pm, ESPN+		Maryland Eastern Shore	L 59–72	5–23 (3–10)	Physical Education Complex (331); Baltimore, MD
March 6, 2025; 8:00 pm, ESPN+		Morgan State	W 82–75 ^{OT}	6–23 (4–10)	Physical Education Complex (730); Baltimore, MD
MEAC tournament
March 12, 2025; 8:00 pm, ESPN+	(7)	vs. (2) South Carolina State; Quarterfinals	L 63–68	6–24	Norfolk Scope; Norfolk, VA
*Non-conference game. ^{#}Rankings from AP Poll. (#) Tournament seedings in parentheses. All times are in Eastern.
