= 2024–25 Delaware State Hornets men's basketball team =

American college basketball season

2024–25 Delaware State Hornets men's basketball
- Conference: Mid-Eastern Athletic Conference
- Record: 16–14 (8–6 MEAC)
- Head coach: Stan Waterman (4th season)
- Assistant coaches: Horace Owens; Vernon Dupree Jr.; Shahid Perkins
- Home arena: Memorial Hall

2024–25 MEAC men's basketball standings
	Conf.				Overall
Team	W		L	PCT	W		L	PCT
Norfolk State †	11	–	3	.786	24	–	11	.686
South Carolina State	11	–	3	.786	20	–	13	.606
Delaware State	8	–	6	.571	16	–	14	.533
Howard	7	–	7	.500	12	–	20	.375
Morgan State	7	–	7	.500	14	–	18	.438
North Carolina Central	6	–	8	.429	14	–	19	.424
Coppin State	4	–	10	.286	6	–	24	.200
Maryland Eastern Shore	2	–	12	.143	6	–	25	.194
† 2025 MEAC tournament winner

The 2024–25 Delaware State Hornets men's basketball team represented Delaware State University during the 2024–25 NCAA Division I men's basketball season. The Hornets, led by fourth-year head coach Stan Waterman, played their home games at Memorial Hall in Dover, Delaware as members of the Mid-Eastern Athletic Conference.

== Previous season ==
The Hornets finished the 2023–24 season 15–19, 6–8 in MEAC play to finish in sixth place. They upset South Carolina State and North Carolina Central, before falling to Howard in the MEAC tournament championship game. They received an invitation to the CBI, receiving the #14 seed, where they would be defeated by eventual tournament champions Seattle in the first round.

== Roster ==
2024–25 Delaware State Hornets men's basketball team
Players
Coaches

Pos.	#	Name	Height	Weight	Year	Previous school	Hometown
G	0	Robert Smith	6 ft 1 in (1.85 m)	190 lb (86 kg)	Sr	West Chester	Philadelphia, PA
F	1	Alston Andrews	6 ft 10 in (2.08 m)	230 lb (104 kg)	GS	Illinois State	Detroit, MI
G	2	Corey Perkins	6 ft 2 in (1.88 m)	185 lb (84 kg)	Sr	Sanford School	Wilmington, DE
G	3	Martaz Robinson	6 ft 2 in (1.88 m)	180 lb (82 kg)	GS	New Town HS	Baltimore, MD
F	4	Caleb Surgers	6 ft 8 in (2.03 m)	—	So	Panther Creek HS	Cary, NC
SG	5	John Clemmons	6 ft 6 in (1.98 m)	203 lb (92 kg)	Fr	Caravel Academy	Bear, DE
G	10	Theodore Pendergrass III	6 ft 2 in (1.88 m)	165 lb (75 kg)	Fr	The Phelps School	Ardmore, PA
F	11	Kaseem Watson	6 ft 9 in (2.06 m)	190 lb (86 kg)	So	West Catholic HS	Philadelphia, PA
F	13	Kareem Watson	6 ft 8 in (2.03 m)	190 lb (86 kg)	Fr	West Catholic HS	Philadelphia, PA
G	15	Ponce James	5 ft 11 in (1.8 m)	180 lb (82 kg)	RS Fr	Bridgeport Prep	Bridgeport, CT
G	21	Elias Walker	6 ft 0 in (1.83 m)	170 lb (77 kg)	Jr	Wilkes	Cheltenham, PA
G	22	Dean Shepherd	6 ft 3 in (1.91 m)	—	So	Tower Hill School	New Castle, DE
SG	23	Jesse Kinard	6 ft 6 in (1.98 m)	205 lb (93 kg)	Jr	Buffalo Island Central HS	Jonesboro, AR
F/C	24	Raymond Somerville	6 ft 11 in (2.11 m)	240 lb (109 kg)	GS	Cal State Bakersfield	Media, PA
F	25	Muneer Newton	6 ft 5 in (1.96 m)	225 lb (102 kg)	Sr	Archbishop Wood HS	Philadelphia, PA
C	32	Javarzia Belton	6 ft 11 in (2.11 m)	280 lb (127 kg)	Jr	Moravian Prep	Calhoun Falls, SC

Head coach

- Stan Waterman (Delaware)

Assistant coach(es)

- Horace Owens (Rhode Island)
- Vernon Dupree Jr. (Wilmington)
- Shahid Perkins (East Tennessee State)

Legend

- (C) Team captain
- (S) Suspended
- (I) Ineligible
- (W) Walk-on
- Injured
- Current redshirt

Roster
Last update: November 20, 2024

== Schedule and results ==
Date time, TV	Rank^{#}	Opponent^{#}	Result	Record	Site (attendance) city, state
Exhibition
October 30, 2024*; 7:00 pm		Delaware Valley	W 99–49	–	Memorial Hall; Dover, DE
Non-conference regular season
November 4, 2024*; 8:00 pm, ACCNX/ESPN+		at Virginia Tech	L 60–83	0–1	Cassell Coliseum (4,453); Blacksburg, VA
November 9, 2024*; 2:00 pm, ESPN+		at Columbia	L 62–83	0–2	Levien Gymnasium (782); New York, NY
November 12, 2024*; 7:00 pm		Gwynedd Mercy	W 70–54	1–2	Memorial Hall; Dover, DE
November 16, 2024*; 4:00 pm, ESPN+		Cheyney	W 93–51	2–2	Memorial Hall (350); Dover, DE
November 19, 2024*; 7:00 pm, FS2		at Providence	L 48–78	2–3	Amica Mutual Pavilion (7,489); Providence, RI
November 23, 2024*; 4:00 pm, ESPN+		at Mount St. Mary's	L 66–76	2–4	Knott Arena (1,590); Emmitsburg, MD
November 26, 2024*; 7:00 pm, ESPN+		Penn State Wilkes-Barre	W 111–43	3–4	Memorial Hall (109); Dover, DE
November 29, 2024*; 8:00 pm, SECN/ESPN+		at Texas	L 68–90	3–5	Moody Center (10,716); Austin, TX
December 3, 2024*; 6:30 pm, FloHoops		at Delaware	L 80–93	3–6	Bob Carpenter Center (2,104); Newark, DE
December 7, 2024*; 2:00 pm, ESPN+		Loyola (MD)	W 80–77	4–6	Memorial Hall (151); Dover, DE
December 11, 2024*; 7:00 pm, ESPN+		NJIT	W 71–59	5–6	Memorial Hall (102); Dover, DE
December 19, 2024*; 2:30 pm, ESPNU		vs. Grambling State; Chris Paul HBCU Challenge	W 73–60	6–6	Mohegan Sun Arena; Uncasville, CT
December 20, 2024*; 1:30 pm, ESPNU		vs. Alabama State; Chris Paul HBCU Challenge	W 83–80	7–6	Mohegan Sun Arena; Uncasville, CT
December 28, 2024*; 1:00 pm, ESPN+		at Saint Joseph's	L 58–76	7–7	Hagan Arena (3,179); Philadelphia, PA
MEAC regular season
January 4, 2025; 4:00 pm, ESPN+		at Howard	L 94–100	7–8 (0–1)	Burr Gymnasium (874); Washington, D.C.
January 6, 2025; 4:30 pm, ESPN+		Norfolk State	L 64–73	7–9 (0–2)	Memorial Hall (1,000); Dover, DE
January 11, 2025; 4:00 pm		at South Carolina State	W 76–75	8–9 (1–2)	SHM Memorial Center (585); Orangeburg, SC
January 13, 2025; 7:30 pm, ESPN+		at North Carolina Central	L 72–75	8–10 (1–3)	McDougald–McLendon Arena (2,578); Durham, NC
January 18, 2025*; 2:00 pm, ESPN+		Virginia Lynchburg	W 126–38	9–10	Memorial Hall (128); Dover, DE
January 25, 2025; 4:00 pm		at Maryland Eastern Shore	W 73–66	10–10 (2–3)	Hytche Athletic Center (401); Princess Anne, MD
February 1, 2025; 4:00 pm, ESPN+		at Coppin State	W 84–61	11–10 (3–3)	Physical Education Complex (778); Baltimore, MD
February 3, 2025; 7:30 pm, ESPN+		Morgan State	W 84–82	12–10 (4–3)	Memorial Hall (304); Dover, DE
February 15, 2025; 4:00 pm, ESPN+		Howard	W 90–69	13–10 (5–3)	Memorial Hall (1,800); Dover, DE
February 17, 2025; 7:30 pm		at Norfolk State	L 84–96	13–11 (5–4)	Joseph G. Echols Memorial Hall (3,124); Norfolk, VA
February 22, 2025; 4:00 pm, ESPN+		South Carolina State	L 88–94 ^{OT}	13–12 (5–5)	Memorial Hall (301); Dover, DE
February 24, 2025; 7:30 pm, ESPN+		North Carolina Central	W 86–84 ^{OT}	14–12 (6–5)	Memorial Hall (501); Dover, DE
March 1, 2025; 4:00 pm, ESPN+		Coppin State	W 83–79	15–12 (7–5)	Memorial Hall (270); Dover, DE
March 3, 2025; 7:30 pm, ESPN+		at Morgan State	L 81–87	15–13 (7–6)	Hill Field House (2,567); Baltimore, MD
March 6, 2025; 7:30 pm, ESPN+		Maryland Eastern Shore	W 75–68	16–13 (8–6)	Memorial Hall (302); Dover, DE
MEAC tournament
March 13, 2025; 8:00 pm, ESPN+	(3)	vs. (6) North Carolina Central; Quarterfinals	L 77–79	16–14	Norfolk Scope; Norfolk, VA
*Non-conference game. ^{#}Rankings from AP Poll. (#) Tournament seedings in parentheses. All times are in Eastern.
