= 2025 MEAC men's basketball tournament =

US collegiate basketball tournament

- Classification: Division I
- Season: 2024–25
- Teams: 8
- Site: Norfolk Scope; Norfolk, Virginia
- Champions: Norfolk State (4th title)
- Winning coach: Robert Jones (3rd title)
- MVP: Brian Moore Jr. (Norfolk State)
- Television: ESPN+, ESPN2

2024–25 MEAC men's basketball standings
	Conf.				Overall
Team	W		L	PCT	W		L	PCT
Norfolk State †	11	–	3	.786	24	–	11	.686
South Carolina State	11	–	3	.786	20	–	13	.606
Delaware State	8	–	6	.571	16	–	14	.533
Howard	7	–	7	.500	12	–	20	.375
Morgan State	7	–	7	.500	14	–	18	.438
North Carolina Central	6	–	8	.429	14	–	19	.424
Coppin State	4	–	10	.286	6	–	24	.200
Maryland Eastern Shore	2	–	12	.143	6	–	25	.194
† 2025 MEAC tournament winner

The 2025 MEAC men's basketball tournament was the postseason men's basketball tournament for the 2024–25 season in the Mid-Eastern Athletic Conference (MEAC). The tournament was held March 12–15, 2025, at Norfolk Scope in Norfolk, Virginia. The tournament winner, Norfolk State, received the conference's automatic invitation to the 2025 NCAA Division I men's basketball tournament.

== Seeds ==
All eight-conference members were eligible for the tournament and were seeded by record within the conference, with a tiebreaker system to seed teams with identical conference records.

Seed	School	Conference	Tiebreaker
1	Norfolk State	11–3	2–0 vs. Delaware State
2	South Carolina State	11–3	1–1 vs. Delaware State
3	Delaware State	8–6	
4	Howard	7–7	2–0 vs. Morgan State
5	Morgan State	7–7	0–2 vs. Howard
6	North Carolina Central	6–8	
7	Coppin State	4–10	
8	Maryland Eastern Shore	2–12	

== Schedule ==
Game	Time*	Matchup^{#}	Score	Television
Quarterfinals – Wednesday, March 12
1	6:00 p.m.	No. 1 Norfolk State vs. No. 8 Maryland Eastern Shore	77–70	ESPN+
2	8:00 p.m.	No. 2 South Carolina State vs. No. 7 Coppin State	68–63	ESPN+
Quarterfinals – Thursday, March 13
3	6:00 p.m.	No. 4 Howard vs. No. 5 Morgan State	90–91	ESPN+
4	8:00 p.m.	No. 3 Delaware State vs No. 6 North Carolina Central	77–79	ESPN+
Semifinals – Friday, March 14
5	6:00 p.m.	No. 1 Norfolk State vs. No. 5 Morgan State	58–55	ESPN+
6	8:00 p.m.	No. 2 South Carolina State vs. No. 6 North Carolina Central	88–67	ESPN+
Championship – Saturday, March 15
7	1:00 p.m.	No. 1 Norfolk State vs. No. 2 South Carolina State	66–65	ESPN2
*Game times in EDT. #-Rankings denote tournament seeding.

== Bracket ==
Quarterfinals; March 12–13; ESPN+
1	Norfolk State	77
8	Maryland Eastern Shore	70
4	Howard	90
5	Morgan State	91
2	South Carolina State	68
7	Coppin State	63
3	Delaware State	77
6	North Carolina Central	79

Semifinals; March 14; ESPN+
1	Norfolk State	58
5	Morgan State	55
2	South Carolina State	88
6	North Carolina Central	67

Championship; March 15; ESPN2
1	Norfolk State	66
2	South Carolina State	65
