= 2025 NCAA Division I men's basketball tournament =

United States top collegiate-level basketball tournament for 2025

- Season: 2024–25
- Teams: 68
- Finals site: Alamodome, San Antonio, Texas
- Champions: Florida Gators (3rd title, 4th title game, 6th Final Four)
- Runner-up: Houston Cougars (3rd title game, 7th Final Four)
- Semifinalists: Auburn Tigers (2nd Final Four); Duke Blue Devils (18th Final Four)
- Winning coach: Todd Golden (1st title)
- MOP: Walter Clayton Jr. (Florida)
- Attendance: 70,961
- Top scorer: Walter Clayton Jr. (Florida) (134 points)

The 2025 NCAA Division I men's basketball tournament was a single-elimination tournament to determine the National Collegiate Athletic Association (NCAA) Division I men's college basketball national champion for the 2024–25 season. The 86th annual edition of the tournament began on March 18, 2025, and concluded on April 7 with the championship game at the Alamodome in San Antonio, Texas.

The Southeastern Conference (SEC) broke the record for the most bids earned to the tournament, with 14 of the 16 teams qualifying. Each regional final featured at least one SEC team. The Atlantic Coast Conference (ACC) had historic lows, with only four teams earning bids, the smallest percentage of the conference since tournament expansion in 1975. Big South champion High Point, Big West champion UC San Diego, Ohio Valley champion SIU Edwardsville, and Summit League champion Omaha made their tournament debuts. ASUN champion Lipscomb made its second-ever appearance, its first since 2018. America East champion Bryant also made its second-ever appearance, its first since 2022, and its first time in the first round. NEC champion Saint Francis also made its second-ever appearance, the first since 1991. A week after losing in the First Four, Saint Francis announced they would move down from Division I to Division III. UC San Diego qualified in its first year of eligibility, becoming only the fourth school since 1972 to achieve this.

This was the second time since the First Four was established in 2011 that no teams in the First Four advanced past the first round, and the first since 2019. For the first time since 2017, no team seeded lower than 12 made it past the first round. In the first round, the Big Ten went 8–0, setting an NCAA record for the most wins without a loss by any conference. The eight total wins were also a record, matched by the SEC in the same first round (8–5). In doing so, both conferences combined to represent 50% of the field in the second round. In the ACC, only Duke advanced past the first round, the first time since at-large bids were granted that multiple teams from that conference failed to reach the second round.

With 10-seed Arkansas advancing to the Sweet 16, it marked the 17th consecutive occurrence in which at least one double-digit seed advanced to the regional semifinals. UConn was attempting to be the first team to win three consecutive titles since UCLA won seven consecutive from 1967 to 1973, but its elimination by the eventual champion Florida in the second round marked the seventh time in the last eight tournaments that the defending champion failed to make the Sweet 16. For the first time since the tournament's 1985 expansion to 64 teams, the Sweet 16 was composed entirely of teams from the Power Four conferences (SEC, Big Ten, Big 12, and ACC).

Though recent tournaments were some of the most upset-prone, 2025 had some of the fewest upsets in NCAA tournament history. No top-four seed lost in the first round, and 10th-seeded Arkansas was the only Sweet 16 team with a higher seed than a #6 seed. All 12 games of the Sweet 16 and Elite Eight were won by the higher-seeded team. As a result, the Elite Eight had four #1 seeds, three #2 seeds, and one #3 seed, tying it with 2007 as the lowest seed total for an Elite Eight in tournament history, and all four #1 seeds made the Final Four, an occurrence only matched by the 2008 tournament (which was also played in San Antonio). The Final Four were the four #1 seeds: Florida, Duke, Houston, and Auburn. The championship matchup was between Florida and Houston. Florida defeated Houston, 65–63, to claim its third title, and its first since 2007.

== Tournament procedure ==
Out of 355 eligible Division I teams, 68 participated in the tournament. (Note: Nine teams are ineligible, all due to being in the process of reclassifying to Division I from a lower division: East Texas A&M, Le Moyne, Lindenwood, Mercyhurst, Queens, St. Thomas, Southern Indiana, Stonehill, and West Georgia.) A total of 31 automatic bids are awarded to each program that wins a conference tournament. The remaining 37 bids are issued "at-large", with selections extended by the NCAA selection committee on Selection Sunday (March 16). The selection committee also created seeds for the entire field from 1 to 68.

Eight teams (the four-lowest seeded automatic qualifiers and the four lowest-seeded at-large teams) play in the First Four. The winners of these games will advance to the main tournament bracket.

First four out
| NET | School | Conference | Record |
|---|---|---|---|
| 51 | West Virginia | Big 12 | 19–13 |
| 54 | Indiana | Big Ten | 19–13 |
| 41 | Ohio State | Big Ten | 17–15 |
| 44 | Boise State | MWC | 24–10 |

== Schedule and venues ==
The following were the sites selected to host each round of the 2025 tournament:

2025 First Four (orange) and first and second rounds (green)
2025 Regionals (blue) and Final Four (red)

First Four

- March 18 and 19
  - University of Dayton Arena, Dayton, Ohio (Host: University of Dayton)

First and second rounds (Subregionals)

- March 20 and 22
  - Amica Mutual Pavilion, Providence, Rhode Island (Host: Providence College)
  - Rupp Arena, Lexington, Kentucky (Host: University of Kentucky)
  - Intrust Bank Arena, Wichita, Kansas (Host: Wichita State University)
  - Ball Arena, Denver, Colorado (Host: Mountain West Conference)
- March 21 and 23
  - Rocket Arena, Cleveland, Ohio (Host: Mid-American Conference)
  - Fiserv Forum, Milwaukee, Wisconsin (Host: Marquette University)
  - Lenovo Center, Raleigh, North Carolina (Host: North Carolina State University)
  - Climate Pledge Arena, Seattle, Washington (Host: University of Washington)

Regional semifinals and finals (Sweet Sixteen and Elite Eight)

- March 27 and 29
  - East Regional
    - Prudential Center, Newark, New Jersey (Host: Seton Hall University)
  - West Regional
    - Chase Center, San Francisco, California (Host: University of San Francisco)
- March 28 and 30
  - South Regional
    - State Farm Arena, Atlanta, Georgia (Host: Georgia Institute of Technology)
  - Midwest Regional
    - Lucas Oil Stadium, Indianapolis, Indiana (Hosts: Horizon League, Indiana University Indianapolis)

National semifinals and championship game (Final Four)

- April 5 and 7
  - Alamodome, San Antonio, Texas (Hosts: University of Texas at San Antonio, University of the Incarnate Word)

San Antonio hosted the Final Four for the fifth time, having previously hosted in 2018.

== Qualification and selection of teams ==
The 68 teams came from 35 states and the District of Columbia.

Teams that participated in the 2025 tournament. South Region (red), East Region (orange), Midwest Region (yellow), and West Region (green)

=== Automatic qualifiers ===
Teams who won their conference championships (31) automatically qualify.

Automatic qualifiers in the 2025 NCAA Division I men's basketball tournament
| Conference | Team | Appearance | Last bid |
|---|---|---|---|
| America East | Bryant | 2nd | 2022 |
| American | Memphis | 29th | 2023 |
| Atlantic 10 | VCU | 20th | 2023 |
| ACC | Duke | 47th | 2024 |
| ASUN | Lipscomb | 2nd | 2018 |
| Big 12 | Houston | 26th | 2024 |
| Big East | St. John's | 31st | 2019 |
| Big Sky | Montana | 13th | 2019 |
| Big South | High Point | 1st | Never |
| Big Ten | Michigan | 32nd | 2022 |
| Big West | UC San Diego | 1st | Never |
| CAA | UNC Wilmington | 7th | 2017 |
| CUSA | Liberty | 6th | 2021 |
| Horizon | Robert Morris | 9th | 2015 |
| Ivy League | Yale | 8th | 2024 |
| MAAC | Mount St. Mary's | 7th | 2021 |
| MAC | Akron | 7th | 2024 |
| MEAC | Norfolk State | 4th | 2022 |
| Missouri Valley | Drake | 8th | 2024 |
| Mountain West | Colorado State | 13th | 2024 |
| NEC | Saint Francis | 2nd | 1991 |
| Ohio Valley | SIU Edwardsville | 1st | Never |
| Patriot | American | 4th | 2014 |
| SEC | Florida | 25th | 2024 |
| Southern | Wofford | 6th | 2019 |
| Southland | McNeese | 4th | 2024 |
| SWAC | Alabama State | 5th | 2011 |
| Summit League | Omaha | 1st | Never |
| Sun Belt | Troy | 3rd | 2017 |
| WAC | Grand Canyon | 4th | 2024 |
| WCC | Gonzaga | 27th | 2024 |

=== Seeds ===
The tournament seeds and regions are determined through the NCAA basketball tournament selection process and were published by the selection committee after the brackets are released on March 16.

East Regional – Prudential Center, Newark, NJ
| Seed | School | Conference | Record | Overall seed | Berth type | Last bid |
|---|---|---|---|---|---|---|
| 1 | Duke | ACC | 31–3 | 2 | Automatic | 2024 |
| 2 | Alabama | SEC | 25–8 | 6 | At Large | 2024 |
| 3 | Wisconsin | Big Ten | 26–9 | 12 | At Large | 2024 |
| 4 | Arizona | Big 12 | 22–12 | 16 | At Large | 2024 |
| 5 | Oregon | Big Ten | 24–9 | 19 | At Large | 2024 |
| 6 | BYU | Big 12 | 24–9 | 21 | At Large | 2024 |
| 7 | Saint Mary's | WCC | 28–5 | 27 | At Large | 2024 |
| 8 | Mississippi State | SEC | 21–12 | 32 | At Large | 2024 |
| 9 | Baylor | Big 12 | 19–14 | 35 | At Large | 2024 |
| 10 | Vanderbilt | SEC | 20–12 | 39 | At Large | 2017 |
| 11 | VCU | Atlantic 10 | 28–6 | 45 | Automatic | 2023 |
| 12 | Liberty | C-USA | 28–6 | 50 | Automatic | 2021 |
| 13 | Akron | MAC | 28–6 | 53 | Automatic | 2024 |
| 14 | Montana | Big Sky | 25–9 | 58 | Automatic | 2019 |
| 15 | Robert Morris | Horizon | 26–8 | 59 | Automatic | 2015 |
| 16* | American | Patriot | 22–12 | 65 | Automatic | 2014 |
| 16* | Mount St. Mary's | MAAC | 22–12 | 66 | Automatic | 2021 |

West Regional – Chase Center, San Francisco, CA
| Seed | School | Conference | Record | Overall seed | Berth type | Last bid |
|---|---|---|---|---|---|---|
| 1 | Florida | SEC | 30–4 | 4 | Automatic | 2024 |
| 2 | St. John's | Big East | 30–4 | 8 | Automatic | 2019 |
| 3 | Texas Tech | Big 12 | 25–8 | 9 | At Large | 2024 |
| 4 | Maryland | Big Ten | 25–8 | 15 | At Large | 2023 |
| 5 | Memphis | American | 29–5 | 20 | Automatic | 2023 |
| 6 | Missouri | SEC | 22–11 | 23 | At Large | 2023 |
| 7 | Kansas | Big 12 | 21–12 | 28 | At Large | 2024 |
| 8 | UConn | Big East | 23–10 | 31 | At Large | 2024 |
| 9 | Oklahoma | SEC | 20–13 | 36 | At Large | 2021 |
| 10 | Arkansas | SEC | 20–13 | 37 | At Large | 2023 |
| 11 | Drake | Missouri Valley | 30–3 | 44 | Automatic | 2024 |
| 12 | Colorado State | Mountain West | 25–9 | 48 | Automatic | 2024 |
| 13 | Grand Canyon | WAC | 26–7 | 54 | Automatic | 2024 |
| 14 | UNC Wilmington | CAA | 27–7 | 57 | Automatic | 2017 |
| 15 | Omaha | Summit | 22–12 | 61 | Automatic | Never |
| 16 | Norfolk State | MEAC | 24–10 | 63 | Automatic | 2022 |

South Regional – State Farm Arena, Atlanta, GA
| Seed | School | Conference | Record | Overall seed | Berth type | Last bid |
|---|---|---|---|---|---|---|
| 1 | Auburn | SEC | 28–5 | 1 | At Large | 2024 |
| 2 | Michigan State | Big Ten | 27–6 | 7 | At Large | 2024 |
| 3 | Iowa State | Big 12 | 24–9 | 10 | At Large | 2024 |
| 4 | Texas A&M | SEC | 22–10 | 13 | At Large | 2024 |
| 5 | Michigan | Big Ten | 25–9 | 17 | Automatic | 2022 |
| 6 | Ole Miss | SEC | 22–11 | 24 | At Large | 2019 |
| 7 | Marquette | Big East | 23–10 | 26 | At Large | 2024 |
| 8 | Louisville | ACC | 27–7 | 29 | At Large | 2019 |
| 9 | Creighton | Big East | 24–10 | 33 | At Large | 2024 |
| 10 | New Mexico | Mountain West | 26–7 | 38 | At Large | 2024 |
| 11* | San Diego State | Mountain West | 21–9 | 43 | At Large | 2024 |
| 11* | North Carolina | ACC | 22–13 | 46 | At Large | 2024 |
| 12 | UC San Diego | Big West | 30–4 | 47 | Automatic | Never |
| 13 | Yale | Ivy | 22–7 | 51 | Automatic | 2024 |
| 14 | Lipscomb | ASUN | 25–9 | 55 | Automatic | 2018 |
| 15 | Bryant | America East | 23–11 | 62 | Automatic | 2022 |
| 16* | Alabama State | SWAC | 19–15 | 67 | Automatic | 2011 |
| 16* | Saint Francis | NEC | 16–17 | 68 | Automatic | 1991 |

Midwest Regional – Lucas Oil Stadium, Indianapolis, IN
| Seed | School | Conference | Record | Overall seed | Berth type | Last bid |
|---|---|---|---|---|---|---|
| 1 | Houston | Big 12 | 30–4 | 3 | Automatic | 2024 |
| 2 | Tennessee | SEC | 27–7 | 5 | At Large | 2024 |
| 3 | Kentucky | SEC | 22–11 | 11 | At Large | 2024 |
| 4 | Purdue | Big Ten | 22–11 | 14 | At Large | 2024 |
| 5 | Clemson | ACC | 27–6 | 18 | At Large | 2024 |
| 6 | Illinois | Big Ten | 21–12 | 22 | At Large | 2024 |
| 7 | UCLA | Big Ten | 22–10 | 25 | At Large | 2023 |
| 8 | Gonzaga | WCC | 25–8 | 30 | Automatic | 2024 |
| 9 | Georgia | SEC | 20–12 | 34 | At Large | 2015 |
| 10 | Utah State | Mountain West | 26–7 | 40 | At Large | 2024 |
| 11* | Texas | SEC | 19–15 | 41 | At Large | 2024 |
| 11* | Xavier | Big East | 21–11 | 42 | At Large | 2023 |
| 12 | McNeese | Southland | 27–6 | 49 | Automatic | 2024 |
| 13 | High Point | Big South | 29–5 | 52 | Automatic | Never |
| 14 | Troy | Sun Belt | 23–10 | 56 | Automatic | 2017 |
| 15 | Wofford | Southern | 19–15 | 60 | Automatic | 2019 |
| 16 | SIU Edwardsville | Ohio Valley | 22–11 | 64 | Automatic | Never |

*See First Four

== Tournament bracket ==
All times are listed in Eastern Daylight Time (UTC−4). Games on CBS are also on Paramount+, while games on TBS, TNT, and truTV are also on Max.

=== First Four – Dayton, Ohio ===
The First Four games involve eight teams: the four lowest-seeded automatic qualifiers and the four lowest-seeded at-large teams.

| March 18 – South Regional |
| 16 | Saint Francis | 68 |
| 16 | Alabama State | 70 |

| March 18 – South Regional |
| 11 | North Carolina | 95 |
| 11 | San Diego State | 68 |

| March 19 – East Regional |
| 16 | Mount St. Mary's | 83 |
| 16 | American | 72 |

| March 19 – Midwest Regional |
| 11 | Xavier | 86 |
| 11 | Texas | 80 |

=== South regional – Atlanta, Georgia ===
First round Round of 64; March 20–21
1 | Auburn | 83
16 | Alabama State | 63
Lexington – Thu/Sat
8 | Louisville | 75
9 | Creighton | 89
5 | Michigan | 68
12 | UC San Diego | 65
Denver – Thu/Sat
4 | Texas A&M | 80
13 | Yale | 71
6 | Ole Miss | 71
11 | North Carolina | 64
Milwaukee – Fri/Sun
3 | Iowa State | 82
14 | Lipscomb | 55
7 | Marquette | 66
10 | New Mexico | 75
Cleveland – Fri/Sun
2 | Michigan State | 87
15 | Bryant | 62

Second round Round of 32; March 22–23
1 | Auburn | 82
9 | Creighton | 70
5 | Michigan | 91
4 | Texas A&M | 79
6 | Ole Miss | 91
3 | Iowa State | 78
10 | New Mexico | 63
2 | Michigan State | 71

Regional semifinals Sweet 16; March 28
1 | Auburn | 78
5 | Michigan | 65
6 | Ole Miss | 70
2 | Michigan State | 73

Regional Final; Elite 8 March 30
1 | Auburn | 70
2 | Michigan State | 64

==== South regional final ====
CBS

March 30
5:05 p.m. EDT

No. 1 Auburn Tigers 70, No. 2 Michigan State Spartans 64
Scoring by half: 33–24, 37–40
| Pts: Broome (25); Rebs: Broome (14); Asts: Baker-Mazara (5) | Pts: Kohler (17); Rebs: Kohler (11); Asts: Fears Jr. (5) |

State Farm Arena – Atlanta, Georgia
Attendance: 16,768
Referees: Ron Groover, Jeff Anderson, Don Daily

==== South regional all-tournament team ====
- Johni Broome (MOP) - Auburn
- Tahaad Pettiford - Auburn
- Jase Richardson - Michigan State
- Danny Wolf - Michigan
- Sean Pedulla - Ole Miss

=== West regional – San Francisco, California ===
First round Round of 64; March 20–21
1 | Florida | 95
16 | Norfolk State | 69
Raleigh – Fri/Sun
8 | UConn | 67
9 | Oklahoma | 59
5 | Memphis | 70
12 | Colorado State | 78
Seattle – Fri/Sun
4 | Maryland | 81
13 | Grand Canyon | 49
6 | Missouri | 57
11 | Drake | 67
Wichita – Thu/Sat
3 | Texas Tech | 82
14 | UNC Wilmington | 72
7 | Kansas | 72
10 | Arkansas | 79
Providence – Thu/Sat
2 | St. John's | 83
15 | Omaha | 53

Second round Round of 32; March 22–23
1 | Florida | 77
8 | UConn | 75
12 | Colorado State | 71
4 | Maryland | 72
11 | Drake | 64
3 | Texas Tech | 77
10 | Arkansas | 75
2 | St. John's | 66

Regional semifinals Sweet 16; March 27
1 | Florida | 87
4 | Maryland | 71
3 | Texas Tech | 85^{OT}
10 | Arkansas | 83

Regional Final; Elite 8 March 29
1 | Florida | 84
3 | Texas Tech | 79

==== West regional final ====
TBS

March 29
6:09 p.m. EDT

No. 1 Florida Gators 84, No. 3 Texas Tech Red Raiders 79
Scoring by half: 40−37, 44−42
| Pts: Clayton Jr. (30); Rebs: Haugh (11); Asts: Clayton Jr. (4) | Pts: Toppin (20); Rebs: Toppin (11); Asts: Hawkins (7) |

Chase Center – San Francisco, California
Attendance: 16,778
Referees: James Breeding, Michael Irving, Steven Anderson

==== West regional all-tournament team ====
- Walter Clayton Jr. (MOP) - Florida
- Thomas Haugh - Florida
- Darrion Williams - Texas Tech
- JT Toppin - Texas Tech
- Johnell Davis - Arkansas

=== East regional – Newark, New Jersey ===
First round Round of 64; March 20–21
1 | Duke | 93
16 | Mount St. Mary's | 49
Raleigh – Fri/Sun
8 | Mississippi State | 72
9 | Baylor | 75
5 | Oregon | 81
12 | Liberty | 52
Seattle – Fri/Sun
4 | Arizona | 93
13 | Akron | 65
6 | BYU | 80
11 | VCU | 71
Denver – Thu/Sat
3 | Wisconsin | 85
14 | Montana | 66
7 | Saint Mary's | 59
10 | Vanderbilt | 56
Cleveland – Fri/Sun
2 | Alabama | 90
15 | Robert Morris | 81

Second round Round of 32; March 22–23
1 | Duke | 89
9 | Baylor | 66
5 | Oregon | 83
4 | Arizona | 87
6 | BYU | 91
3 | Wisconsin | 89
7 | Saint Mary's | 66
2 | Alabama | 80

Regional semifinals Sweet 16; March 27
1 | Duke | 100
4 | Arizona | 93
6 | BYU | 88
2 | Alabama | 113

Regional Final; Elite 8 March 29
1 | Duke | 85
2 | Alabama | 65

==== East regional final ====
TBS/TruTV

March 29
8:49 p.m. EDT

No. 1 Duke Blue Devils 85, No. 2 Alabama Crimson Tide 65
Scoring by half: 46–37, 39–28
| Pts: Knueppel (21); Rebs: Tied (9); Asts: Knueppel (5) | Pts: Philon (16); Rebs: Nelson (7); Asts: Sears (6) |

Prudential Center – Newark, New Jersey
Attendance: 18,793
Referees: Terry Oglesby, Roger Ayers, Greg Nixon

==== East regional all-tournament team ====
- Cooper Flagg (MOP) - Duke
- Kon Knueppel - Duke
- Khaman Maluach - Duke
- Mark Sears - Alabama
- Caleb Love - Arizona

=== Midwest regional – Indianapolis, Indiana ===
First round Round of 64; March 20–21
1 | Houston | 78
16 | SIU Edwardsville | 40
Wichita – Thu/Sat
8 | Gonzaga | 89
9 | Georgia | 68
5 | Clemson | 67
12 | McNeese | 69
Providence – Thu/Sat
4 | Purdue | 75
13 | High Point | 63
6 | Illinois | 86
11 | Xavier | 73
Milwaukee – Fri/Sun
3 | Kentucky | 76
14 | Troy | 57
7 | UCLA | 72
10 | Utah State | 47
Lexington – Thu/Sat
2 | Tennessee | 77
15 | Wofford | 62

Second round Round of 32; March 22–23
1 | Houston | 81
8 | Gonzaga | 76
12 | McNeese | 62
4 | Purdue | 76
6 | Illinois | 75
3 | Kentucky | 84
7 | UCLA | 58
2 | Tennessee | 67

Regional semifinals Sweet 16; March 28
1 | Houston | 62
4 | Purdue | 60
3 | Kentucky | 65
2 | Tennessee | 78

Regional Final; Elite 8 March 30
1 | Houston | 69
2 | Tennessee | 50

==== Midwest regional final ====
CBS

March 30
2:20 p.m. EDT

No. 1 Houston Cougars 69, No. 2 Tennessee Volunteers 50
Scoring by half: 34–15, 35–35
| Pts: Cryer (17); Rebs: Tugler (9); Asts: Tied (4) | Pts: Tied (17); Rebs: Okpara (9); Asts: Zeigler (5) |

Lucas Oil Stadium – Indianapolis, Indiana
Attendance: 18,567
Referees: Doug Sirmons, Courtney Green, A.J. Desai

==== Midwest regional all-tournament team ====
- Emanuel Sharp (MOP) - Houston
- LJ Cryer - Houston
- Milos Uzan - Houston
- Jordan Gainey - Tennessee
- Braden Smith - Purdue

=== Final Four – San Antonio, Texas ===
National Semifinals; Final Four; Saturday, April 5
S1 | Auburn | 73
W1 | Florida | 79
E1 | Duke | 67
MW1 | Houston | 70

National Championship Game; Monday, April 7
W1 | Florida | 65
MW1 | Houston | 63

==== National semifinals ====
CBS
Paramount+

April 5
6:09 p.m. EDT

Recap

W1 Florida Gators 79, S1 Auburn Tigers 73
Scoring by half: 38–46, 41–27
| Pts: Walter Clayton Jr., 34; Rebs: Rueben Chinyelu, 9 Asts: Alex Condon, 3 | Pts: Chad Baker-Mazara, 18; Rebs: Dylan Cardwell, 8 Asts: Tahaad Pettiford, 4 |

Alamodome – San Antonio, Texas
Attendance: 68,252
Referees: Roger Ayers, Tony Padilla, Courtney Green

CBS
Paramount+

April 5
8:49 p.m. EDT

Recap

MW1 Houston Cougars 70, E1 Duke Blue Devils 67
Scoring by half: 28–34, 42–33
| Pts: LJ Cryer, 26; Rebs: J'Wan Roberts, 12; Asts: J'Wan Roberts, 5 | Pts: Cooper Flagg, 27; Rebs: Flagg and Knueppel, 7 Asts: Cooper Flagg, 4 |

Alamodome – San Antonio, Texas
Attendance: 68,252
Referees: Keith Kimble, James Breeding, Doug Shows

==== National championship ====
CBS
Paramount+

April 7
8:50 p.m. EDT

Recap

W1 Florida Gators 65, MW1 Houston Cougars 63
Scoring by half: 28–31, 37–32
| Pts: Will Richard, 18; Rebs: Will Richard, 8 Asts: Walter Clayton Jr., 7 | Pts: LJ Cryer, 19; Rebs: J'Wan Roberts, 8 Asts: LJ Cryer, 2 |

Alamodome – San Antonio, Texas
Attendance: 66,602
Referees: Ron Groover, Doug Sirmons, Terry Oglesby

==== Final Four all-tournament team ====
- Walter Clayton Jr. (MOP) – Florida
- Will Richard – Florida
- LJ Cryer – Houston
- J'Wan Roberts – Houston
- Cooper Flagg – Duke

== Record by conference ==
Overview of conference performance in the 2025 NCAA Division I men's basketball tournament
| Conference | Bids | Record | Win % | FF | R64 | R32 | S16 | E8 | F4 | CG | NC |
|---|---|---|---|---|---|---|---|---|---|---|---|
| Southeastern | 14* | 23–13 | .639 | 1 | 13 | 8* | 7* | 4 | 2 | 1 | 1 |
| Big 12 | 7 | 14–7 | .667 | – | 7 | 6 | 4 | 2 | 1 | 1 | – |
| Atlantic Coast | 4 | 5–4 | .556 | 1 | 4 | 1 | 1 | 1 | 1 | – | – |
| Big Ten | 8 | 13–8 | .619 | – | 8 | 8* | 4 | 1 | – | – | – |
| Big East | 5 | 4–5 | .444 | 1 | 5 | 3 | – | – | – | – | – |
| West Coast | 2 | 2–2 | .500 | – | 2 | 2 | – | – | – | – | – |
| Mountain West | 4 | 2–4 | .333 | 1 | 3 | 2 | – | – | – | – | – |
| Missouri Valley | 1 | 1–1 | .500 | – | 1 | 1 | – | – | – | – | – |
| Southland | 1 | 1–1 | .500 | – | 1 | 1 | – | – | – | – | – |
| MAAC | 1 | 1–1 | .500 | 1 | 1 | – | – | – | – | – | – |
| SWAC | 1 | 1–1 | .500 | 1 | 1 | – | – | – | – | – | – |
| American | 1 | 0–1 | .000 | – | 1 | – | – | – | – | – | – |
| America East | 1 | 0–1 | .000 | – | 1 | – | – | – | – | – | – |
| ASUN | 1 | 0–1 | .000 | – | 1 | – | – | – | – | – | – |
| Atlantic 10 | 1 | 0–1 | .000 | – | 1 | – | – | – | – | – | – |
| Big Sky | 1 | 0–1 | .000 | – | 1 | – | – | – | – | – | – |
| Big South | 1 | 0–1 | .000 | – | 1 | – | – | – | – | – | – |
| Big West | 1 | 0–1 | .000 | – | 1 | – | – | – | – | – | – |
| CAA | 1 | 0–1 | .000 | – | 1 | – | – | – | – | – | – |
| CUSA | 1 | 0–1 | .000 | – | 1 | – | – | – | – | – | – |
| Horizon | 1 | 0–1 | .000 | – | 1 | – | – | – | – | – | – |
| Ivy League | 1 | 0–1 | .000 | – | 1 | – | – | – | – | – | – |
| MAC | 1 | 0–1 | .000 | – | 1 | – | – | – | – | – | – |
| MEAC | 1 | 0–1 | .000 | – | 1 | – | – | – | – | – | – |
| Ohio Valley | 1 | 0–1 | .000 | – | 1 | – | – | – | – | – | – |
| Southern | 1 | 0–1 | .000 | – | 1 | – | – | – | – | – | – |
| Summit | 1 | 0–1 | .000 | – | 1 | – | – | – | – | – | – |
| Sun Belt | 1 | 0–1 | .000 | – | 1 | – | – | – | – | – | – |
| WAC | 1 | 0–1 | .000 | – | 1 | – | – | – | – | – | – |
| Northeast | 1 | 0–1 | .000 | 1 | – | – | – | – | – | – | – |
| Patriot | 1 | 0–1 | .000 | 1 | – | – | – | – | – | – | – |

*Tournament record

== Game summaries and tournament notes ==
The “seed composition” of the Elite Eight was the exact same in both the men's and women's tournament -

Men's Elite Eight -

Four #1 seeds, three #2 seeds, one #3 seed.

Women's Elite Eight -

Four #1 seeds, three #2 seeds, one #3 seed.

=== Tournament upsets ===
Per the NCAA, an upset occurs "when the losing team in an NCAA tournament game was seeded at least five seed lines better than the winning team."

The 2025 tournament had a total of four upsets, with three in the first round and one in the second round.

Upsets in the 2025 NCAA Division I men's basketball tournament
| Round | West | Midwest | South | East |
|---|---|---|---|---|
| Round of 64 | No. 11 Drake defeated No. 6 Missouri, 67–57; No. 12 Colorado State defeated No. 5 Memphis, 78–70 | No. 12 McNeese defeated No. 5 Clemson, 69–67 | None | |
| Round of 32 | No. 10 Arkansas defeated No. 2 St. John's, 75–66 | None | | |
| Sweet 16 | None | | | |
| Elite 8 | None | | | |
| Final 4 | None | | | |
| National Championship | None | | | |

== Media coverage ==
=== Television ===
CBS Sports and TNT Sports had US television rights to the tournament. As part of a cycle that began in 2016, CBS televised the 2025 Final Four and the national championship game.

This was the first NCAA tournament since the death of Greg Gumbel, who served as the studio host from 1998 through 2023, and missed the 2024 tournament due to family health issues. Gumbel died from cancer on December 27, 2024.

==== Linear channels ====
- Selection Show – CBS
- First Four – TruTV
- First and Second Rounds – CBS, TBS, TNT, and TruTV
- Regional Semifinals (Sweet 16) and Finals (Elite 8) – CBS, TBS, and TruTV
- National Semifinals (Final Four) and Championship – CBS

==== Streaming ====
- Max (only TBS, TNT, and truTV games)
- Paramount+ (only CBS games)
- March Madness app and website with authentication

==== Studio hosts ====
- Ernie Johnson (New York City and San Antonio) – First and second rounds, regionals, Final Four and national championship game
- Adam Zucker (New York City and San Antonio) – First and second rounds and Final Four
- Adam Lefkoe (Atlanta) – First Four, first and second rounds, and regional semifinals
- Jamie Erdahl (New York City) – First and second rounds (game breaks)

==== Studio analysts ====
- Charles Barkley (New York City and San Antonio) – First and second rounds, regionals, Final Four and national championship game
- Seth Davis (Atlanta and San Antonio) – First Four, first and second rounds, regional semifinals and Final Four
- Clark Kellogg (New York City and San Antonio) – First and second rounds, regionals, Final Four and national championship game
- Candace Parker (Atlanta) – First and second rounds and regional semifinals
- Jalen Rose (Atlanta and San Antonio) – First Four and Final Four
- Kenny Smith (New York City and San Antonio) – First and second rounds, regionals, Final Four and national championship game
- Gene Steratore (New York City and San Antonio) (Rules Analyst) – First Four, first and second rounds, regionals, Final Four and national championship game
- Wally Szczerbiak (New York City and San Antonio) – Second round and Final Four
- Jay Wright (Atlanta, New York City and San Antonio) – First Four, first and second rounds, regionals, Final Four and national championship game

==== Broadcast assignments ====
- Ian Eagle/Bill Raftery/Grant Hill/Tracy Wolfson – First and second rounds at Raleigh, North Carolina; South Regional at Atlanta, Georgia; Final Four and National Championship at San Antonio, Texas
- Brian Anderson/Jim Jackson/Allie LaForce – First and second rounds at Lexington, Kentucky; East Regional at Newark, New Jersey
- Kevin Harlan/Dan Bonner/Stan Van Gundy/Lauren Shehadi – First and second rounds at Milwaukee, Wisconsin; West Regional at San Francisco, California
- Andrew Catalon/Steve Lappas/Evan Washburn – First and second rounds at Providence, Rhode Island; Midwest Regional at Indianapolis, Indiana
- Brad Nessler/Brendan Haywood/Dana Jacobson – First and second rounds at Denver, Colorado
- Spero Dedes/Jim Spanarkel/Jon Rothstein – First Four at Dayton, Ohio; First and second rounds at Cleveland, Ohio
- Lisa Byington/Robbie Hummel/Jalen Rose/Andy Katz – First and second rounds at Seattle, Washington
- Tom McCarthy/Debbie Antonelli/Steve Smith/AJ Ross – First and second rounds at Wichita, Kansas

==== Most watched tournament games ====
(#) Tournament seedings and region in parentheses.

| Rank | Round | Date and time (ET) | Matchup | | | Network | Viewers (millions) | TV rating |
|---|---|---|---|---|---|---|---|---|
| 1 | National Championship | April 7, 2025, 8:50 p.m. | (1 W) Florida | 65–63 | (1 MW) Houston | CBS | 18.1 | |
| 2 | Final Four | April 5, 2025, 8:39 p.m. | (1 MW) Houston | 70–67 | (1 E) Duke | CBS | 16.3 | |
| 3 | Final Four | April 5, 2025, 6:09 p.m. | (1 W) Florida | 79–73 | (1 S) Auburn | CBS | 14.8 | |
| 4 | Elite Eight | March 30, 2025, 4:05 p.m. | (1 S) Auburn | 70–61 | (8 S) Michigan State | CBS | 11.7 | |
| 5 | Elite Eight | March 29, 2025, 8:49 p.m. | (1 E) Duke | 85–65 | (2 E) Alabama | TBS/TruTV | 9.8 | |
| 6 | Elite Eight | March 29, 2025, 7:49 p.m. | (1 W) Florida | 84–79 | (3 W) Texas Tech | TBS/TruTV | 7.5 | |
| 7 | Sweet Sixteen | March 28, 2025, 9:39 p.m. | (1 S) Auburn | 78–65 | (5 S) Michigan | CBS | 7.34 | 3.6 |
| 8 | Elite Eight | March 30, 2025, 2:20 p.m. | (1 MW) Houston | 69–50 | (2 MW) Tennessee | CBS | 7.1 | |
| 9 | Sweet Sixteen | March 28, 2025, 7:09 p.m. | (2 S) Michigan State | 73–70 | (6 S) Ole Miss | CBS | 6.71 | |
| 10 | Sweet Sixteen | March 27, 2025, 9:39 p.m. | (1 E) Duke | 100–93 | (4 E) Arizona | CBS | 6.57 | 3.5 |

=== Radio ===
Westwood One will have exclusive coverage of the entire tournament.

==== First Four ====
- Nate Gatter and King McClure – at Dayton, Ohio

==== First and second rounds ====
- Chris Carrino and Jordan Cornette – Providence, Rhode Island
- John Sadak and LaPhonso Ellis – Lexington, Kentucky
- Ted Emrich and Casey Jacobsen – Wichita, Kansas
- Kevin Kugler and Austin Croshere – Denver, Colorado
- Scott Graham and Jon Crispin – Cleveland, Ohio
- Noah Eagle and Tom Crean – Milwaukee, Wisconsin
- Jason Benetti and Sarah Kustok – Raleigh, North Carolina
- Ryan Radtke and P. J. Carlesimo – Seattle, Washington

==== Regionals ====
- Scott Graham and Jordan Cornette – East Regional at Newark, New Jersey
- Ryan Radtke and P. J. Carlesimo – West Regional at San Francisco, California
- Spero Dedes and Tom Crean – South Regional at Atlanta, Georgia
- Kevin Kugler and Robbie Hummel – Midwest Regional at Indianapolis, Indiana

==== Final Four and national championship ====
- Kevin Kugler, Robbie Hummel, P. J. Carlesimo, and Andy Katz – San Antonio, Texas

=== Internet ===
Video

Live video of games is available for streaming through the following means:

- NCAA March Madness Live (website and app, CBS games available for free on digital media players; access to all other games requires TV Everywhere authentication through provider)
- Watch TBS website and app (only TBS games, required TV Everywhere authentication)
- Watch TNT website and app (only TNT games, required TV Everywhere authentication)
- Watch truTV website and app (only truTV games, required TV Everywhere authentication)
- CBS website and app (only CBS games, required TV Everywhere authentication)
- Websites and apps of cable, satellite, and OTT providers of CBS, TBS, TNT, and truTV (access required subscription)

For the app this year, a multiview that showed all games airing simultaneously was available for the second straight year.

In addition, the March Madness app will offer Fast Break, whip around coverage of games similar to NFL RedZone on the first weekend of the tournament (first and second rounds).

- Jared Greenberg, Randolph Childress, Tony Delk, Josh Pastner (Atlanta) - First and second round

Audio

Live audio of games is available for streaming through the following means:

- NCAA March Madness Live (website and app)
- Westwood One Sports website
- TuneIn (website and app, required TuneIn Premium subscription)
- Varsity Network app
- Websites and apps of Westwood One Sports affiliates

The March Madness app also supports Apple CarPlay and Android Auto through a native app.

== See also ==
- 2025 NCAA Division I women's basketball tournament
- 2025 NCAA Division II men's basketball tournament
- 2025 NCAA Division III men's basketball tournament
- 2025 National Invitation Tournament
- 2025 College Basketball Crown
- 2025 College Basketball Invitational
