= 2024–25 South Carolina State Bulldogs basketball team =

American college basketball season

2024–25 South Carolina State Bulldogs basketball

MEAC regular season co-champions
- Conference: Mid-Eastern Athletic Conference
- Record: 20–13 (11–3 MEAC)
- Head coach: Erik Martin (3rd season)
- Assistant coaches: Bernie Coaxum; Raheem Waller; Jarelle Redden
- Home arena: SHM Memorial Center

2024–25 MEAC men's basketball standings
	Conf.				Overall
Team	W		L	PCT	W		L	PCT
Norfolk State †	11	–	3	.786	24	–	11	.686
South Carolina State	11	–	3	.786	20	–	13	.606
Delaware State	8	–	6	.571	16	–	14	.533
Howard	7	–	7	.500	12	–	20	.375
Morgan State	7	–	7	.500	14	–	18	.438
North Carolina Central	6	–	8	.429	14	–	19	.424
Coppin State	4	–	10	.286	6	–	24	.200
Maryland Eastern Shore	2	–	12	.143	6	–	25	.194
† 2025 MEAC tournament winner

The 2024–25 South Carolina State Bulldogs basketball team represented South Carolina State University during the 2024–25 NCAA Division I men's basketball season. The Bulldogs, led by third-year head coach Erik Martin, played their home games at SHM Memorial Center in Orangeburg, South Carolina as members of the Mid-Eastern Athletic Conference.

== Previous season ==
The Bulldogs finished the 2023–24 season 14–18, 9–5 in MEAC play to finish in a three-way tie for second place. They were defeated by Delaware State in the quarterfinals of the MEAC tournament.

== Roster ==
2024–25 South Carolina State Bulldogs men's basketball team
Players
Coaches

Pos.	#	Name	Height	Weight	Year	Previous school	Hometown
G	0	Omar Croskey	6 ft 6 in (1.98 m)	190 lb (86 kg)	GS	Sumter HS	Sumter, SC
G	1	Florian Tenebay	6 ft 6 in (1.98 m)	195 lb (88 kg)	Jr	Central Georgia Tech	Le Carbet, Martinique
G	2	Colin McKenzie	6 ft 6 in (1.98 m)	200 lb (91 kg)	Jr	Spartanburg Methodist College	Charleston, SC
G	3	Michael Teal	6 ft 1 in (1.85 m)	170 lb (77 kg)	Sr	Merced College	Alexandria, VA
F	4	Caleb McCarty	6 ft 8 in (2.03 m)	195 lb (88 kg)	Sr	Gulf Coast State College	Biloxi, MS
PG	5	Jayden Johnson	6 ft 1 in (1.85 m)	165 lb (75 kg)	Fr	Cushing Academy	Brooklyn, NY
G	10	John Seay-Oliver	6 ft 3 in (1.91 m)	170 lb (77 kg)	So	South Cobb HS	Atlanta, GA
G	11	Wilson Dubinsky	6 ft 3 in (1.91 m)	195 lb (88 kg)	Sr	Seward County CC	Ottawa, ON
G	12	Mitchell Taylor	6 ft 7 in (2.01 m)	—	Fr	Middle Georgia Prep	Atlanta, GA
F	13	Drayton Jones	6 ft 11 in (2.11 m)	245 lb (111 kg)	So	Oak Hill Academy	Houston, TX
G	14	Jamal Miles	6 ft 4 in (1.93 m)	190 lb (86 kg)	Fr	South County HS	Lorton, VA
F	15	Roko Maric	6 ft 10 in (2.08 m)	220 lb (100 kg)	Fr	Vancouver College	Vancouver, BC
F	22	James Morrow	6 ft 8 in (2.03 m)	220 lb (100 kg)	So	Andrew Jackson HS	Jacksonville, FL
F	23	D'Shay Wright	6 ft 9 in (2.06 m)	210 lb (95 kg)	Fr	Polaris Prep	Ajax, ON
F	31	Laquan Hunt	6 ft 4 in (1.93 m)	210 lb (95 kg)	RS So	Conway HS	Bronx, NY
F	55	Davion Everett	6 ft 6 in (1.98 m)	225 lb (102 kg)	Sr	Ridge View HS	Columbia, SC

Head coach

- Erik Martin (Cincinnati)

Assistant coach(es)

- Bernie Coaxum (Charleston)
- Raheem Waller (South Carolina State)
- Jarelle Redden (North Alabama)

Legend

- (C) Team captain
- (S) Suspended
- (I) Ineligible
- (W) Walk-on
- Injured
- Current redshirt

Roster
Last update: November 21, 2024

== Schedule and results ==
Date time, TV	Rank^{#}	Opponent^{#}	Result	Record	High points	High rebounds	High assists	Site (attendance) city, state
Exhibition
October 29, 2024*; 7:00 pm		Claflin	W 76–71	–	– -	– -	– -	SHM Memorial Center; Orangeburg, SC
Non-conference regular season
November 4, 2024*; 7:30 pm		Morris	W 137–55	1–0	29 – Dubinsky	6 – McCarty	5 – Tenebay	SHM Memorial Center (521); Orangeburg, SC
November 8, 2024*; 7:00 pm, SECN+/ESPN+		at South Carolina	L 64–86	1–1	11 – Teal	6 – Jones	3 – Tied	Colonial Life Arena (12,205); Columbia, SC
November 11, 2024*; 7:00 pm		Voorhees	W 94–48	2–1	17 – Everett	7 – Tied	4 – Johnson	SHM Memorial Center (654); Orangeburg, SC
November 14, 2024*; 7:00 pm, ESPN+		at Jacksonville	L 62–71	2–2	15 – Croskey	6 – Croskey	3 – Jones	Swisher Gymnasium (1,500); Jacksonville, FL
November 16, 2024*; 2:00 pm		at Bethune–Cookman	L 62–75	2–3	16 – Jones	7 – Jones	4 – Taylor	Moore Gymnasium (478); Daytona Beach, FL
November 22, 2024*; 8:00 pm		at Alabama A&M; Bulldog Bash	W 82–70	3–3	20 – Croskey	7 – Jones	5 – Tenebay	AAMU Event Center (1,431); Huntsville, AL
November 23, 2024*; 2:00 pm		vs. IU Indy; Bulldog Bash	W 72–62	4–3	23 – Jones	8 – Everett	3 – Tied	AAMU Event Center (169); Huntsville, AL
November 27, 2024*; 7:00 pm, ESPN+		at Marshall	L 53–82	4–4	10 – Jones	5 – Everett	2 – Teal	Cam Henderson Center (3,766); Huntington, WV
December 1, 2024*; 4:30 pm, FS1		at No. 22 Xavier	L 68–71	4–5	16 – Croskey	4 – Tied	5 – Taylor	Cintas Center (9,512); Cincinnati, OH
December 5, 2024*; 7:00 pm		Samford	L 81–88	4–6	15 – Dubinsky	5 – Tied	4 – Tied	SHM Memorial Center (211); Orangeburg, SC
December 9, 2024*; 7:00 pm		Charleston Southern	W 82–63	5–6	34 – Jones	8 – Jones	5 – Tied	SHM Memorial Center (155); Orangeburg, SC
December 14, 2024*; 12:00 pm, ESPN+		at Furman	L 64–68	5–7	15 – Jones	10 – Everett	3 – Tied	Bon Secours Wellness Arena (2,374); Greenville, SC
December 18, 2024*; 6:00 pm, ESPN+		at USC Upstate	W 85–70	6–7	14 – Jones	6 – Croskey	4 – Taylor	G. B. Hodge Center (495); Spartanburg, SC
December 21, 2024*; 1:00 pm, ESPN+		at Northern Kentucky	L 47–58	6–8	13 – McKenzie	7 – Jones	4 – Jones	Truist Arena (1,937); Highland Heights, KY
December 29, 2024*; 2:00 pm, SECN+/ESPN+		at Georgia	L 72–79	6–9	16 – Johnson	7 – Jones	3 – Johnson	Stegeman Coliseum (10,140); Athens, GA
MEAC regular season
January 4, 2025; 4:00 pm		at Morgan State	W 86–72	7–9 (1–0)	20 – Jones	8 – Everett	5 – Taylor	Hill Field House (112); Baltimore, MD
January 6, 2025; 7:30 pm, ESPN+		at Coppin State	W 85–77	8–9 (2–0)	18 – Croskey	9 – Tied	3 – Tied	Physical Education Complex (210); Baltimore, MD
January 11, 2025; 4:00 pm		Delaware State	L 75–76	8–10 (2–1)	18 – Croskey	4 – Tied	1 – Tied	SHM Memorial Center (585); Orangeburg, SC
January 13, 2025; 7:30 pm		Maryland Eastern Shore	W 78–64	9–10 (3–1)	21 – Everett	8 – Everett	4 – Everett	SHM Memorial Center (486); Orangeburg, SC
January 25, 2025; 4:00 pm, ESPN+		at North Carolina Central	L 77–82	9–11 (3–2)	16 – Taylor	8 – Tenebay	4 – Taylor	McDougald–McLendon Arena (2,519); Durham, NC
February 1, 2025; 4:00 pm, ESPN+		at Norfolk State	L 65–67 ^{OT}	9–12 (3–3)	15 – Taylor	6 – Tied	2 – Tied	Joseph G. Echols Memorial Hall (3,704); Norfolk, VA
February 3, 2025; 7:30 pm, ESPN+		at Howard	W 89–66	10–12 (4–3)	27 – Croskey	8 – Tied	6 – Taylor	Burr Gymnasium (1,362); Washington, D.C.
February 8, 2025*; 2:00 pm		Mid-Atlantic Christian	W 114–75	11–12	19 – Everett	9 – Jones	7 – Johnson	SHM Memorial Center (535); Orangeburg, SC
February 15, 2025; 4:00 pm		Morgan State	W 90–62	12–12 (5–3)	16 – Croskey	7 – McCarty	6 – Teal	SHM Memorial Center (763); Orangeburg, SC
February 17, 2025; 7:30 pm		Coppin State	W 87–57	13–12 (6–3)	23 – Everett	6 – Everett	4 – Tied	SHM Memorial Center (436); Orangeburg, SC
February 22, 2025; 4:00 pm, ESPN+		at Delaware State	W 94–88 ^{OT}	14–12 (7–3)	23 – Taylor	9 – Dubinsky	4 – Johnson	Memorial Hall (301); Dover, DE
February 24, 2025; 8:00 pm		at Maryland Eastern Shore	W 81–68	15–12 (8–3)	20 – Croskey	12 – Croskey	4 – Taylor	Hytche Athletic Center (650); Princess Anne, MD
March 1, 2025; 4:00 pm		Norfolk State	W 91–88	16–12 (9–3)	20 – Jones	10 – Everett	5 – Everett	SHM Memorial Center (686); Orangeburg, SC
March 3, 2025; 7:30 pm		Howard	W 79–69	17–12 (10–3)	19 – Everett	12 – Jones	3 – Croskey	SHM Memorial Center (678); Orangeburg, SC
March 6, 2025; 7:30 pm		North Carolina Central	W 87–71	18–12 (11–3)	26 – Croskey	9 – Croskey	6 – Johnson	SHM Memorial Center (725); Orangeburg, SC
MEAC tournament
March 12, 2025; 8:00 pm, ESPN+	(2)	vs. (7) Coppin State; Quarterfinals	W 68–63	19–12	20 – Dubinsky	7 – Everett	4 – Johnson	Norfolk Scope; Norfolk, VA
March 14, 2025; 8:00 pm, ESPN+	(2)	vs. (6) North Carolina Central; Semifinals	W 88–67	20–12	30 – Croskey	5 – Croskey	5 – Taylor	Norfolk Scope; Norfolk, VA
March 15, 2025; 1:00 pm, ESPN2	(2)	vs. (1) Norfolk State; Championship	L 65–66	20–13	24 – Dubinsky	6 – Jones	5 – Teal	Norfolk Scope; Norfolk, VA
*Non-conference game. ^{#}Rankings from AP Poll. (#) Tournament seedings in parentheses. All times are in Eastern.
