= 2024–25 North Carolina Central Eagles men's basketball team =

American college basketball season

2024–25 North Carolina Central Eagles men's basketball
- Conference: Mid-Eastern Athletic Conference
- Record: 14–19 (6–8 MEAC)
- Head coach: LeVelle Moton (16th season)
- Assistant coaches: Reggie Sharp; Nigel Thomas; Nima Omidvar
- Home arena: McDougald–McLendon Arena

2024–25 MEAC men's basketball standings
	Conf.				Overall
Team	W		L	PCT	W		L	PCT
Norfolk State †	11	–	3	.786	24	–	11	.686
South Carolina State	11	–	3	.786	20	–	13	.606
Delaware State	8	–	6	.571	16	–	14	.533
Howard	7	–	7	.500	12	–	20	.375
Morgan State	7	–	7	.500	14	–	18	.438
North Carolina Central	6	–	8	.429	14	–	19	.424
Coppin State	4	–	10	.286	6	–	24	.200
Maryland Eastern Shore	2	–	12	.143	6	–	25	.194
† 2025 MEAC tournament winner

The 2024–25 North Carolina Central Eagles men's basketball team represented North Carolina Central University during the 2024–25 NCAA Division I men's basketball season. The Eagles, led by 16th-year head coach LeVelle Moton, played their home games at McDougald–McLendon Arena in Durham, North Carolina as members of the Mid-Eastern Athletic Conference.

== Previous season ==
The Eagles finished the 2023–24 season 18–13, 9–5 in MEAC play to finish in a three-way tie for second place. They defeated Maryland Eastern Shore, before being upset by Delaware State in the semifinals of the MEAC tournament.

== Roster ==
2024–25 North Carolina Central Eagles men's basketball team
Players
Coaches

Pos.	#	Name	Height	Weight	Year	Previous school	Hometown
G	0	Caleb Ellison	6 ft 0 in (1.83 m)	148 lb (67 kg)	RS Fr	Ronald W. Reagan HS	Winston-Salem, NC
G	1	Keishon Porter	6 ft 5 in (1.96 m)	195 lb (88 kg)	Sr	Cape Fear CC	Pinetops, NC
G	2	Dionte Johnson	6 ft 0 in (1.83 m)	190 lb (86 kg)	Jr	Maryland Eastern Shore	Bronx, NY
G	3	Aquan Smart	6 ft 3 in (1.91 m)	175 lb (79 kg)	Sr	Southeast Missouri State	Evanston, IL
G	4	Camren Daniels	6 ft 5 in (1.96 m)	175 lb (79 kg)	Fr	Southern Durham HS	Durham, NC
F	5	Timmy Adedire	6 ft 4 in (1.93 m)	208 lb (94 kg)	Sr	Perry Hall HS	Baltimore, MD
F	7	Gbenga Olubi	6 ft 7 in (2.01 m)	200 lb (91 kg)	RS Jr	Utah State Eastern	Corona, CA
G	11	Isaac Parson	6 ft 2 in (1.88 m)	170 lb (77 kg)	RS Sr	Winston-Salem State	Kinston, NC
F	12	Perry Smith Jr.	6 ft 9 in (2.06 m)	230 lb (104 kg)	Jr	Vermont	Augusta, GA
G	14	Floyd Rideau Jr.	6 ft 5 in (1.96 m)	170 lb (77 kg)	RS Sr	USC Upstate	Lake Wales, FL
G	22	Chris Daniels	6 ft 1 in (1.85 m)	175 lb (79 kg)	Sr	Millbrook HS	Raleigh, NC
F	23	Kelechi Okworogwo	6 ft 6 in (1.98 m)	215 lb (98 kg)	Jr	Maryland Eastern Shore	Bronx, NY
F	24	Anthony Peoples Jr.	6 ft 9 in (2.06 m)	225 lb (102 kg)	Jr	Lewis–Clark State	Eastvale, CA
G	30	Josh Smith	6 ft 4 in (1.93 m)	175 lb (79 kg)	Jr	Independence CC	Chicago, IL
G	35	Po'Boigh King	6 ft 4 in (1.93 m)	195 lb (88 kg)	Jr	Harcum College	Roanoke Rapids, NC
F	55	Jaqai Murray	6 ft 7 in (2.01 m)	215 lb (98 kg)	Jr	Coahoma CC	Brooklyn, NY

Head coach

- LeVelle Moton (North Carolina Central)

Assistant coach(es)

- Reggie Sharp (Auburn)
- Nigel Thomas (Langston)
- Nima Omidvar (Maryland)

Legend

- (C) Team captain
- (S) Suspended
- (I) Ineligible
- (W) Walk-on
- Injured
- Current redshirt

Roster
Last update: November 21, 2024

== Schedule and results ==
Date time, TV	Rank^{#}	Opponent^{#}	Result	Record	High points	High rebounds	High assists	Site (attendance) city, state
Non-conference regular season
November 4, 2024*; 7:00 pm, ESPN+		at George Mason	L 58–75	0–1	14 – Smith	6 – Adedire	4 – Johnson	EagleBank Arena (3,207); Fairfax, VA
November 8, 2024*; 1:00 pm		Gardner–Webb	L 82–88	0–2	21 – Smith	4 – Johnson	5 – Smith	McDougald–McLendon Arena (437); Durham, NC
November 12, 2024*; 7:00 pm, ESPN+		at High Point	L 60–76	0–3	22 – King	8 – Tied	5 – Johnson	Qubein Center (2,896); High Point, NC
November 15, 2024*; 7:30 pm		vs. Georgia Southern; Rock Hill Classic	L 75–80	0–4	21 – Smith Jr.	7 – Tied	5 – Johnson	Rock Hill Sports & Event Center (1,324); Rock Hill, SC
November 16, 2024*; 7:30 pm, ESPN+		vs. William & Mary; Rock Hill Classic	W 78–76	1–4	22 – King	7 – Smith Jr.	4 – Tied	Rock Hill Sports & Event Center (1,597); Rock Hill, SC
November 17, 2024*; 2:30 pm, ESPN+		at Winthrop; Rock Hill Classic	L 75–77	1–5	18 – King	6 – Murray	4 – Tied	Rock Hill Sports & Event Center (1,390); Rock Hill, SC
November 22, 2024*; 7:00 pm, ESPN+		at Georgia State	L 79–93	1–6	19 – King	6 – Porter	8 – Johnson	GSU Convocation Center (540); Atlanta, GA
November 25, 2024*; 7:00 pm, ESPN+		Carolina	W 91–36	2–6	15 – Tied	7 – Okworogwo	7 – Parson	McDougald–McLendon Arena (143); Durham, NC
November 30, 2024*; 3:00 pm, ESPN+		Virginia Lynchburg	W 131–51	3–6	23 – Porter	10 – Tied	7 – Adedire	McDougald–McLendon Arena (145); Durham, NC
December 5, 2024*; 7:00 pm, ESPN+		Radford	L 67–70	3–7	20 – Smith Jr.	8 – Smith Jr.	5 – Johnson	McDougald–McLendon Arena (225); Durham, NC
December 7, 2024*; 2:00 pm, ESPN+		at Gardner–Webb	W 78–77	4–7	28 – King	6 – King	7 – Parson	Paul Porter Arena (375); Boiling Springs, NC
December 10, 2024*; 7:00 pm, ESPN+		at West Virginia	L 45–79	4–8	16 – Parson	6 – Tied	3 – Smart	WVU Coliseum (8,711); Morgantown, WV
December 14, 2024*; 2:00 pm, ESPN+		at Longwood	W 77–70	5–8	20 – Porter	8 – Murray	7 – Parson	Joan Perry Brock Center (2,024); Farmville, VA
December 17, 2024*; 7:00 pm, ESPN+		Mid-Atlantic Christian	W 112–67	6–8	25 – Porter	10 – Porter	10 – Parson	McDougald–McLendon Arena (137); Durham, NC
December 20, 2024*; 7:00 pm, ESPN+		Longwood	L 67–82	6–9	21 – King	6 – King	10 – Parson	McDougald–McLendon Arena (265); Durham, NC
December 28, 2024*; 2:00 pm, CBS/Paramount+		at North Carolina A&T; CBS Sports Classic: HBCU Showcase/Rivalry	L 72–85	6–10	21 – King	7 – Tied	4 – Parson	Corbett Sports Center (4,011); Greensboro, NC
December 31, 2024*; 3:00 pm		St. Andrews	W 121–61	7–10	26 – Rideau Jr.	11 – Smart	16 – Johnson	McDougald–McLendon Arena (278); Durham, NC
MEAC regular season
January 4, 2025; 4:30 pm, ESPN+		at Coppin State	L 61–63	7–11 (0–1)	18 – King	6 – Tied	5 – Johnson	Physical Education Complex (411); Baltimore, MD
January 6, 2025; 7:30 pm, ESPN+		at Morgan State	L 98–102 ^{2OT}	7–12 (0–2)	19 – Tied	12 – Smith Jr.	6 – Parson	Hill Field House (78); Baltimore, MD
January 11, 2025; 4:00 pm, ESPN+		Maryland Eastern Shore	W 88–69	8–12 (1–2)	23 – Tied	5 – Porter	5 – Tied	McDougald–McLendon Arena (1,328); Durham, NC
January 13, 2025; 7:30 pm, ESPN+		Delaware State	W 75–72	9–12 (2–2)	19 – Parson	9 – Porter	3 – Tied	McDougald–McLendon Arena (2,578); Durham, NC
January 25, 2025; 4:00 pm, ESPN+		South Carolina State	W 82–77	10–12 (3–2)	25 – King	6 – Tied	6 – Parson	McDougald–McLendon Arena (2,519); Durham, NC
February 3, 2025; 7:30 pm, ESPNU		at Norfolk State	L 78–81	10–13 (3–3)	24 – Smith Jr.	9 – Smith Jr.	5 – Parson	Joseph G. Echols Memorial Hall; Norfolk, VA
February 8, 2025; 7:00 pm, ESPN+		at Howard	L 78–82	10–14 (3–4)	16 – King	6 – Murray	8 – Parson	Burr Gymnasium (2,131); Washington, D.C.
February 15, 2025; 4:00 pm, ESPN+		Coppin State	W 71–59	11–14 (4–4)	16 – King	8 – Adedire	6 – Parson	McDougald–McLendon Arena (1,244); Durham, NC
February 17, 2025; 7:30 pm, ESPN+		Morgan State	L 78–92	11–15 (4–5)	19 – Smith Jr.	12 – Smith Jr.	8 – Johnson	McDougald–McLendon Arena (674); Durham, NC
February 24, 2025; 7:30 pm, ESPN+		at Delaware State	L 84–86 ^{OT}	11–16 (4–6)	23 – King	13 – Smith Jr.	6 – Parson	Memorial Hall (501); Dover, DE
February 26, 2025; 8:00 pm		at Maryland Eastern Shore	L 59–68	11–17 (4–7)	18 – Smith Jr.	8 – Smith Jr.	6 – Johnson	Hytche Athletic Center (501); Princess Anne, MD
March 1, 2025; 4:00 pm, ESPN+		Howard	W 72–68	12–17 (5–7)	20 – King	10 – Smith Jr.	4 – Johnson	McDougald–McLendon Arena (945); Durham, NC
March 3, 2025; 7:30 pm, ESPN+		Norfolk State	W 91–87 ^{OT}	13–17 (6–7)	24 – Porter	11 – Smith Jr.	5 – Johnson	McDougald–McLendon Arena (1,025); Durham, NC
March 6, 2025; 7:30 pm		at South Carolina State	L 71–87	13–18 (6–8)	14 – Rideau Jr.	6 – Tied	4 – Parson	SHM Memorial Center (725); Orangeburg, SC
MEAC tournament
March 13, 2025; 8:00 pm, ESPN+	(6)	vs. (3) Delaware State; Quarterfinals	W 79–77	14–18	22 – Smith Jr.	6 – Smith Jr.	4 – Parson	Norfolk Scope; Norfolk, VA
March 14, 2025; 8:00 pm, ESPN+	(6)	vs. (2) South Carolina State; Semifinals	L 67–88	14–19	20 – Smith Jr.	9 – Smith Jr.	3 – Tied	Norfolk Scope; Norfolk, VA
*Non-conference game. ^{#}Rankings from AP Poll. (#) Tournament seedings in parentheses. All times are in Eastern.
