= 2024–25 Norfolk State Spartans men's basketball team =

American college basketball season

2024–25 Norfolk State Spartans men's basketball
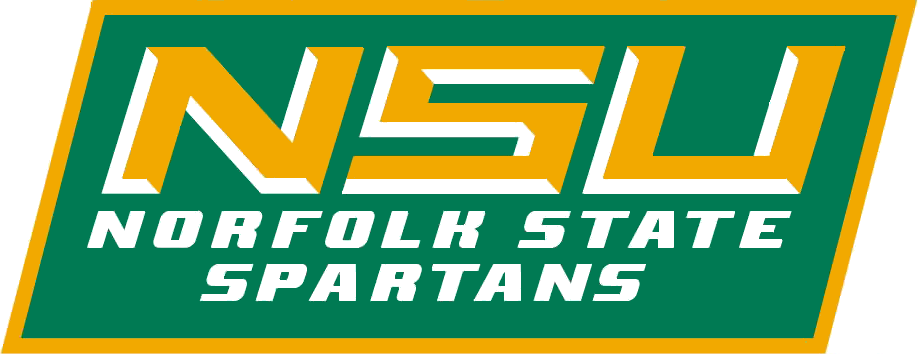

MEAC regular season & tournament champions

NCAA tournament, First Round
- Conference: Mid-Eastern Athletic Conference
- Record: 24–11 (11–3 MEAC)
- Head coach: Robert Jones (12th season)
- Associate head coach: Jamal Brown
- Assistant coaches: C.J. Clemons; Leonard Fairley; Steven Whitley
- Home arena: Echols Hall

2024–25 MEAC men's basketball standings
	Conf.				Overall
Team	W		L	PCT	W		L	PCT
Norfolk State †	11	–	3	.786	24	–	11	.686
South Carolina State	11	–	3	.786	20	–	13	.606
Delaware State	8	–	6	.571	16	–	14	.533
Howard	7	–	7	.500	12	–	20	.375
Morgan State	7	–	7	.500	14	–	18	.438
North Carolina Central	6	–	8	.429	14	–	19	.424
Coppin State	4	–	10	.286	6	–	24	.200
Maryland Eastern Shore	2	–	12	.143	6	–	25	.194
† 2025 MEAC tournament winner

The 2024–25 Norfolk State Spartans men's basketball team represented Norfolk State University during the 2024–25 NCAA Division I men's basketball season. The Spartans, led by 12th-year head coach Robert Jones, played their home games at Echols Hall in Norfolk, Virginia as members of the Mid-Eastern Athletic Conference.

== Previous season ==
The Spartans finished the 2023–24 season 24–11, 11–3 in MEAC play to finish as MEAC regular season champions. They defeated Coppin State, before being upset by eventual tournament champions Howard in the semifinals of the MEAC tournament. They received an invitation to the CIT, where they defeated Alabama A&M and Purdue Fort Wayne to win the CIT championship.

== Roster ==
2024–25 Norfolk State Spartans men's basketball team
Players
Coaches

Pos.	#	Name	Height	Weight	Year	Previous school	Hometown
G	0	Christian Ings	6 ft 2 in (1.88 m)	180 lb (82 kg)	GS	Rider	Philadelphia, Pennsylvania
G	2	Terrance Jones	6 ft 3 in (1.91 m)	180 lb (82 kg)	GS	Eastern Wyoming	Trenton, New Jersey
G	3	My'kel Jenkins	6 ft 5 in (1.96 m)	195 lb (88 kg)	Fr	Woodside High School	Tarboro, North Carolina
G	5	Brian Moore Jr.	6 ft 2 in (1.88 m)	185 lb (84 kg)	GS	Murray State	Harlem, New York
F	6	Melo Baines	6 ft 8 in (2.03 m)	225 lb (102 kg)	Fr	Lake Taylor High School	Norfolk, Virginia
F	7	Kuluel Mading	6 ft 11 in (2.11 m)	210 lb (95 kg)	Sr	Buffalo	High Point, North Carolina
F	8	Tyrel Bladen	6 ft 10 in (2.08 m)	235 lb (107 kg)	GS	Rider	Coatesville, Pennsylvania
F	9	Jalen Myers	6 ft 8 in (2.03 m)	200 lb (91 kg)	GS	UT Martin	Huntsville, Alabama
G	11	Jaylani Darden	6 ft 5 in (1.96 m)	175 lb (79 kg)	Sr	Longwood	Norfolk, Virginia
G	13	Sin'Cere McMahon	6 ft 0 in (1.83 m)	170 lb (77 kg)	Sr	Winthrop	Indianapolis, Indiana
G	20	Jordan Leaks	6 ft 3 in (1.91 m)	170 lb (77 kg)	RS Fr	Phoebus High School	Hampton, Virginia
F	24	Chris Fields Jr.	6 ft 7 in (2.01 m)	240 lb (109 kg)	So	Petersburg High School	Petersburg, Virginia
G	35	Dramane Camara	6 ft 6 in (1.98 m)	215 lb (98 kg)	So	DePaul	Paris, France

Head coach

- Robert Jones (SUNY New Paltz)

Assistant coach(es)

- Jamal Brown (South Carolina State)
- C.J. Clemons (Norfolk State)
- Leonard Fairley (Norfolk State)
- Steven Whitley (Norfolk State)

Legend

- (C) Team captain
- (S) Suspended
- (I) Ineligible
- (W) Walk-on
- Injured
- Current redshirt

Roster
Last update: November 18, 2024

== Schedule and results ==
Date time, TV	Rank^{#}	Opponent^{#}	Result	Record	High points	High rebounds	High assists	Site (attendance) city, state
Non-conference regular season
November 4, 2024*; 8:00 pm		Penn State Wilkes-Barre	W 96–41	1–0	18 – Moore Jr.	8 – Bladen	10 – Ings	Echols Hall (2,317); Norfolk, VA
November 6, 2024*; 7:00 pm		Virginia Lynchburg	W 104–60	2–0	26 – Moore Jr.	10 – Camara	5 – McMahon	Echols Hall; Norfolk, VA
November 9, 2024*; 6:00 pm		James Madison	W 83–69	3–0	22 – Ings	6 – Mading	2 – Tied	Echols Hall (3,170); Norfolk, VA
November 12, 2024*; 7:00 pm, FloHoops		at William & Mary	L 73–84	3–1	31 – Moore Jr.	6 – Tied	2 – Tied	Kaplan Arena (2,210); Williamsburg, VA
November 16, 2024*; 8:00 pm		at Hampton; Battle of the Bay	W 67–58	4–1	20 – Moore Jr.	7 – Tied	7 – Ings	Hampton Convocation Center (6,539); Hampton, VA
November 20, 2024*; 10:00 pm, ACCNX/ESPN+		at Stanford; Acrisure Series Showcase on-campus game	L 63–70	4–2	24 – Moore Jr.	7 – Darden	2 – Moore Jr.	Maples Pavilion (1,881); Stanford, CA
November 22, 2024*; 9:00 pm, ESPN+		at Grand Canyon; Acrisure Series Showcase on-campus game	L 73–91	4–3	20 – Myers	4 – Bladen	4 – Jones	Global Credit Union Arena (7,022); Phoenix, AZ
November 25, 2024*; 9:00 pm, ESPN+		at UC Davis; Acrisure Series Showcase on-campus game	W 76–55	5–3	19 – Moore Jr.	7 – Darden	6 – Ings	University Credit Union Center (1,113); Davis, CA
December 1, 2024*; 1:00 pm, SNY/FloHoops		at Stony Brook	W 77–66	6–3	18 – Moore Jr.	9 – Bladen	5 – Ings	Island Federal Arena; Stony Brook, NY
December 9, 2024*; 7:00 pm		Hofstra	L 67–80	6–4	17 – Myers	5 – Myers	5 – Ings	Echols Hall (1,562); Norfolk, VA
December 11, 2024*; 12:00 pm, ESPN+		at Baylor	L 69–94	6–5	12 – Ings	7 – Myers	4 – Ings	Foster Pavilion (7,500); Waco, TX
December 15, 2024*; 1:00 pm, ESPN+		at Northern Kentucky	L 62–71	6–6	12 – Tied	7 – Myers	3 – Ings	Truist Arena (3,279); Highland Heights, KY
December 19, 2024*; 12:00 pm, ESPNU		vs. Alabama State; Chris Paul HBCU Challenge	W 71–54	7–6	15 – Moore Jr.	8 – Myers	4 – Ings	Mohegan Sun Arena; Uncasville, CT
December 20, 2024*; 11:00 am, ESPNU		vs. Grambling State; Chris Paul HBCU Challenge	W 76–70	8–6	20 – Moore Jr.	10 – Moore Jr.	4 – Moore Jr.	Mohegan Sun Arena; Uncasville, CT
December 29, 2024*; 2:00 pm, ESPN+		at High Point	W 77–74	9–6	33 – Moore Jr.	5 – Tied	6 – Moore Jr.	Qubein Center (2,743); High Point, NC
December 31, 2024*; 3:00 pm, SECN+/ESPN+		at No. 1 Tennessee	L 52–67	9–7	19 – Ings	6 – Bladen	4 – Ings	Thompson–Boling Arena (19,616); Knoxville, TN
MEAC regular season
January 4, 2025; 4:00 pm		Maryland Eastern Shore	W 81–59	10–7 (1–0)	22 – Moore Jr.	7 – Tied	6 – Darden	Echols Hall (2,436); Norfolk, VA
January 6, 2025; 4:30 pm, ESPN+		at Delaware State	W 73–64	11–7 (2–0)	20 – Myers	9 – Tied	6 – Darden	Memorial Hall (1,000); Dover, DE
January 11, 2025; 4:00 pm		Coppin State	W 92–69	12–7 (3–0)	21 – Ings	8 – Myers	4 – Tied	Echols Hall (1,978); Norfolk, VA
January 13, 2025; 7:30 pm		at Morgan State	L 74–78	12–8 (3–1)	20 – Jones	7 – Tied	5 – Moore Jr.	Hill Field House (323); Baltimore, MD
January 20, 2025*; 5:00 pm, ESPN+		Washington Adventist	W 105–42	13–8	20 – Moore Jr.	11 – Mading	7 – Moore Jr.	Echols Hall (1,647); Norfolk, VA
January 25, 2025; 4:00 pm, ESPNU		Howard	W 92–75	14–8 (4–1)	30 – Moore Jr.	8 – Myers	5 – Darden	Echols Hall (3,715); Norfolk, VA
February 1, 2025; 4:00 pm, ESPN+		South Carolina State	W 67–65 ^{OT}	15–8 (5–1)	20 – Jones	9 – Darden	3 – Tied	Echols Hall (3,704); Norfolk, VA
February 3, 2025; 7:30 pm, ESPNU		North Carolina Central	W 81–78	16–8 (6–1)	19 – Moore Jr.	6 – Tied	4 – Darden	Echols Hall; Norfolk, VA
February 15, 2025; 4:00 pm		at Maryland Eastern Shore	W 75–63	17–8 (7–1)	17 – Moore Jr.	6 – Tied	4 – Moore Jr.	Hytche Athletic Center (842); Princess Anne, MD
February 17, 2025; 7:30 pm, ESPN+		Delaware State	W 96–84	18–8 (8–1)	23 – Fields Jr.	9 – Fields Jr.	6 – Fields Jr.	Echols Hall (3,124); Norfolk, VA
February 22, 2025; 4:30 pm, ESPN+		at Coppin State	W 79–63	19–8 (9–1)	14 – Moore Jr.	8 – Jones	6 – Ings	Physical Education Complex (2,315); Baltimore, MD
February 24, 2025; 7:30 pm, ESPN+		Morgan State	W 69–60	20–8 (10–1)	12 – Ings	14 – Mading	2 – Tied	Echols Hall (3,787); Norfolk, VA
March 1, 2025; 4:00 pm		at South Carolina State	L 88–91	20–9 (10–2)	27 – Moore Jr.	7 – Fields Jr.	6 – Ings	SHM Memorial Center (686); Orangeburg, SC
March 3, 2025; 7:30 pm, ESPN+		at North Carolina Central	L 87–91 ^{OT}	20–10 (10–3)	24 – Moore Jr.	6 – Fields Jr.	6 – Moore Jr.	McDougald–McLendon Arena (1,025); Durham, NC
March 6, 2025; 7:30 pm, ESPN+		at Howard	W 81–69	21–10 (11–3)	21 – Moore Jr.	10 – Myers	4 – Moore Jr.	Burr Gymnasium (1,298); Washington, D.C.
MEAC tournament
March 12, 2025; 6:00 pm, ESPN+	(1)	vs. (8) Maryland Eastern Shore; Quarterfinals	W 77–70	22–10	22 – Myers	7 – Tied	6 – Tied	Norfolk Scope; Norfolk, VA
March 14, 2025; 6:00 pm, ESPN+	(1)	vs. (5) Morgan State; Semifinals	W 58–55	23–10	19 – Ings	8 – Fields Jr.	4 – Darden	Norfolk Scope; Norfolk, VA
March 15, 2025; 1:00 pm, ESPN2	(1)	vs. (2) South Carolina State; Championship	W 66–65	24–10	16 – Ings	7 – Tied	4 – Tied	Norfolk Scope; Norfolk, VA
NCAA tournament
March 21, 2025*; 6:50 pm, TNT	(16 W)	vs. (1 W) No. 3 Florida; First Round	L 69–95	24–11	16 – Ings	6 – Darden	3 – Tied	Lenovo Center (19,178); Raleigh, NC
*Non-conference game. ^{#}Rankings from AP Poll. (#) Tournament seedings in parentheses. W=West. All times are in Eastern.
