= 2024–25 Howard Bison men's basketball team =

American college basketball season

2024–25 Howard Bison men's basketball
- Conference: Mid-Eastern Athletic Conference
- Record: 12–20 (7–7 MEAC)
- Head coach: Kenny Blakeney (6th season)
- Associate head coach: Rod Balanis
- Assistant coaches: Tyler Thornton; Steve Ongley; Tramel Raggs
- Home arena: Burr Gymnasium

2024–25 MEAC men's basketball standings
	Conf.				Overall
Team	W		L	PCT	W		L	PCT
Norfolk State †	11	–	3	.786	24	–	11	.686
South Carolina State	11	–	3	.786	20	–	13	.606
Delaware State	8	–	6	.571	16	–	14	.533
Howard	7	–	7	.500	12	–	20	.375
Morgan State	7	–	7	.500	14	–	18	.438
North Carolina Central	6	–	8	.429	14	–	19	.424
Coppin State	4	–	10	.286	6	–	24	.200
Maryland Eastern Shore	2	–	12	.143	6	–	25	.194
† 2025 MEAC tournament winner

The 2024–25 Howard Bison men's basketball team represented Howard University during the 2024–25 NCAA Division I men's basketball season. The Bison, led by sixth-year head coach Kenny Blakeney, played their home games at Burr Gymnasium in Washington, D.C. as members of the Mid-Eastern Athletic Conference (MEAC).

== Previous season ==
The Bison finished the 2023–24 season 18–14, 9–5 in MEAC play, to finish in a three-way tie for second place. They defeated Morgan State, Norfolk State and Delaware State to win their second consecutive MEAC tournament championship and earned the MEAC's automatic bid to the NCAA tournament. They received the #16 seed in the West Region, where they fell to Wagner in the First Four.

== Roster ==
2024–25 Howard Bison men's basketball team
Players
Coaches

Pos.	#	Name	Height	Weight	Year	Previous school	Hometown
G	0	Isaiah Brown	6 ft 1 in (1.85 m)	170 lb (77 kg)	Fr	Don Bosco Prep	Ramsey, NJ
G	1	Anwar Gill	6 ft 4 in (1.93 m)	205 lb (93 kg)	GS	La Salle	Washington, D.C.
F	2	Dom Campbell	6 ft 9 in (2.06 m)	268 lb (122 kg)	Jr	Notre Dame	Scarborough, ME
G	3	Jaren Johnson	6 ft 5 in (1.96 m)	185 lb (84 kg)	GS	Dartmouth	Lynwood, CA
F	4	Miles Stewart	6 ft 7 in (2.01 m)	202 lb (92 kg)	RS Jr	Lake Highland Prep	Orlando, FL
G	5	Marcus Dockery	6 ft 2 in (1.88 m)	170 lb (77 kg)	Sr	Maryland	Washington, D.C.
G	7	Blake Harper	6 ft 5 in (1.96 m)	—	Fr	Gonzaga College HS	Washington, D.C.
G	8	Joshua Strong	6 ft 0 in (1.83 m)	175 lb (79 kg)	GS	Minnesota Duluth	Brooklyn Park, MN
G	9	LB Jr. Towns	5 ft 8 in (1.73 m)	—	Jr	Linden-McKinley HS	Columbus, OH
G	11	Ose Okojie	6 ft 5 in (1.96 m)	191 lb (87 kg)	Jr	United Scholastic Academy	Brampton, ON
F	14	Ayodele Taiwo	6 ft 9 in (2.06 m)	243 lb (110 kg)	RS Jr	NBA Academy Africa	Lagos, Nigeria
F	15	Cameron Shockley-Okeke	6 ft 6 in (1.98 m)	195 lb (88 kg)	GS	Embry–Riddle	Norwalk, CT
F	21	Calvin Jr. Robins	6 ft 5 in (1.96 m)	185 lb (84 kg)	Fr	Kenwood Academy	Chicago, IL
F	23	Mounir Hima	6 ft 11 in (2.11 m)	230 lb (104 kg)	Sr	Syracuse	Tillabéri, Niger
G	34	Bryce Harris	6 ft 4 in (1.93 m)	220 lb (100 kg)	Sr	Putnam Science Academy	Brentwood, NY

Head coach

- Kenny Blakeney (Duke)

Assistant coach(es)

- Rod Balanis (Georgia Tech)
- Tyler Thornton (Duke)
- Steve Ongley (Southern Connecticut)
- Tramel Raggs (Missouri)

Legend

- (C) Team captain
- (S) Suspended
- (I) Ineligible
- (W) Walk-on
- Injured
- Current redshirt

Roster
Last update: November 19, 2024

== Schedule and results ==
Date time, TV	Rank^{#}	Opponent^{#}	Result	Record	Site (attendance) city, state
Exhibition
October 19, 2024*; 11:00 a.m.		William & Mary	W 74–63	–	Burr Gymnasium; Washington, D.C.
October 28, 2024*; 7:00 p.m.		at American	L 66–74	–	Bender Arena; Washington, D.C.
Regular season
November 4, 2024*; 8:00 p.m., ESPN+		at No. 1 Kansas; McLendon Classic	L 57–87	0–1	Allen Fieldhouse (15,300); Lawrence, KS
November 8, 2024*; 8:00 p.m., SECN+/ESPN+		at Missouri	L 62–77	0–2	Mizzou Arena (11,044); Columbia, MO
November 11, 2024*; 12:00 p.m., ESPN+		Dillard	W 91–73	1–2	Burr Gymnasium (1,060); Washington, D.C.
November 13, 2024*; 7:00 p.m.		vs. Tennessee State; HBCU All Stars Challenge	W 88–84 ^{OT}	2–2	GSU Convocation Center; Atlanta, GA
November 18, 2024*; 7:00 p.m., ESPN+		at FIU	W 75–70	3–2	Ocean Bank Convocation Center (764); Miami, FL
November 24, 2024*; 12:00 p.m.		vs. Boston University; UMBC MTE	L 62–69	3–3	Chesapeake Employers Insurance Arena (57); Catonsville, MD
November 25, 2024*; 12:00 p.m., ESPN+		at UMBC; UMBC MTE	L 77–95	3–4	Chesapeake Employers Insurance Arena (1,077); Catonsville, MD
November 30, 2024*; 2:00 p.m., ESPN+		Mount St. Mary's	L 75–79	3–5	Burr Gymnasium (655); Washington, D.C.
December 8, 2024*; 2:00 p.m., ESPN+		at No. 14 Cincinnati	L 67–84	3–6	Fifth Third Arena (10,913); Cincinnati, OH
December 11, 2024*; 7:00 p.m., ESPN+		Virginia Lynchburg	W 124–50	4–6	Burr Gymnasium (544); Washington, D.C.
December 14, 2024*; 3:00 p.m., ESPN+		UNC Wilmington	W 88–83	5–6	Burr Gymnasium (499); Washington, D.C.
December 17, 2024*; 4:00 p.m., ESPN+		Drexel	L 65–68	5–7	Burr Gymnasium (683); Washington, D.C.
December 28, 2024*; 4:00 p.m., CBS/Paramount+		at Hampton; CBS Sports Classic: HBCU Showcase	L 67–83	5–8	Hampton Convocation Center (4,213); Hampton, VA
January 1, 2025*; 1:00 p.m., ESPN+		at Yale	L 65–93	5–9	John J. Lee Amphitheater (1,479); New Haven, CT
January 4, 2025; 4:00 p.m., ESPN+		Delaware State	W 100–94	6–9 (1–0)	Burr Gymnasium (874); Washington, D.C.
January 11, 2025; 4:00 p.m., ESPN+		Morgan State	W 100–95	7–9 (2–0)	Burr Gymnasium (1,023); Washington, D.C.
January 13, 2025; 7:30 p.m., ESPN+		Coppin State	W 90–75	8–9 (3–0)	Burr Gymnasium; Washington, D.C.
January 15, 2025*; 7:00 p.m., ESPN+		Bowie State	L 73–76	8–10	Burr Gymnasium (2,100); Washington, D.C.
January 20, 2025*; 7:00 p.m., ESPN+		Morehouse	L 76–79	8–11	Burr Gymnasium (2,695); Washington, D.C.
January 25, 2025; 4:00 p.m., ESPN+		at Norfolk State	L 75–92	8–12 (3–1)	Joseph G. Echols Memorial Hall (3,715); Norfolk, VA
February 1, 2024*; 3:00 p.m., ESPN+		vs. Hampton	L 79–80 ^{OT}	8–13	Entertainment and Sports Arena (2,100); Washington, D.C.
February 3, 2025; 7:30 p.m., ESPN+		South Carolina State	L 66–89	8–14 (3–2)	Burr Gymnasium (1,362); Washington, D.C.
February 8, 2025; 12:00 p.m., ESPN+		North Carolina Central	W 82–78	9–14 (4–2)	Burr Gymnasium (2,131); Washington, D.C.
February 10, 2025; 8:00 p.m.		at Maryland Eastern Shore	W 77–57	10–14 (5–2)	Hytche Athletic Center (734); Princess Anne, MD
February 15, 2025; 4:00 p.m., ESPN+		at Delaware State	L 69–90	10–15 (5–3)	Memorial Hall (1,800); Dover, DE
February 17, 2025; 7:30 p.m., ESPN+		Maryland Eastern Shore	W 86–62	11–15 (6–3)	Burr Gymnasium (1,328); Washington, D.C.
February 22, 2025; 4:00 p.m., ESPN+		at Morgan State	W 87–81	12–15 (7–3)	Hill Field House (4,234); Baltimore, MD
February 24, 2025; 8:00 p.m., ESPN+		at Coppin State	L 61–72	12–16 (7–4)	Physical Education Complex (388); Baltimore, MD
March 1, 2025; 4:00 p.m., ESPN+		at North Carolina Central	L 68–72	12–17 (7–5)	McDougald–McLendon Arena (945); Durham, NC
March 3, 2025; 7:30 p.m.		at South Carolina State	L 69–79	12–18 (7–6)	SHM Memorial Center (678); Orangeburg, SC
March 6, 2025; 7:30 p.m., ESPN+		Norfolk State	L 69–81	12–19 (7–7)	Burr Gymnasium (1,298); Washington, D.C.
MEAC tournament
March 13, 2025; 6:00 p.m., ESPN+	(4)	vs. (5) Morgan State; Quarterfinals	L 90–91	12–20	Norfolk Scope; Norfolk, VA
*Non-conference game. ^{#}Rankings from AP poll. (#) Tournament seedings in parentheses. All times are in Eastern.
