= Morgan State University Athletic Hall of Fame =

This List of Morgan State University Athletic Hall of Fame is a list of inductees into the Athletic Hall of Fame at Morgan State University.

== History ==
Initially established in 1959 by the Morgan State University Athletic Department, all nominations and inductions are now overseen by the Morgan State University Varsity "M" Club.

== Selection process ==
The Hall of Fame is an association of those athletes who attended Morgan State University, were nominated, and then selected for Hall of Fame recognition. Nominations cannot be considered until at least 10 years have passed since the applicant's graduation or exit from the university. Student-athlete nominees must have been a record holder or an outstanding performer while at the university and in good academic standing.

== Induction ceremony ==
Finalists are inducted at an Annual Hall of Fame Induction luncheon during the Fall of each academic year. Inductees are honored at half-time ceremonies during the Morgan State University football homecoming game and a commemorative plaque is placed in the Hall of Fame.

== Facility ==
The Morgan State University Athletic Hall of Fame is located in the Talmadge Marse Hill Fieldhouse on the campus of Morgan State University.

== Inductees ==
=== Baseball ===
Inductee	Class	Position	Ref
Black, Joe			

=== Basketball ===
Inductee	Class	Position	Ref
Brown, Ernest			
Brown, Thomas			
Brown, Alvin			
Burke, Allen			
Byron, Cyril			
Cain, William			
Clark, Daniel			
Clarke, Wilbur "Ace			
Conrad, Thomas			
Davis, Chet			
Day, Terry			
Dennis, Jack			
Drake, Carl			
Frazier, Nat			
Freeman, William			
Gaines, Clarence			
Garrett, Earnest			
Garrison, T. Madison			
Gibson, Joseph			
Gibson, Charles			
Givins, Oscar			
Grimsley, Preston			
Hackett, Rufus			
Henderson, Tillman			
Howard, Ely			
Irvin, Calvin C.			
Jackson, Willie			
James, Albert			
Jane Spry, Doris			
Jones, Willard			
Jones, Ed			
Jones, William			
Lampkin, William			
Logan, Bonnie Dayle			
Marse Hill, Talmadge			
Murdock, Ezra			
Payne, William			
Robinson Jones, Laura			
Ryan, Maceo			
Showell Cottman, Georganna			
Slade, Kevin Preston			
Smith, Henry			
Smith, Robert			
Sowell, Richard			
Spencer, Howard			
Sterling, Russell			
Taylor, Nathaniel			
Turpin, Samuel			
Weaver, Warren			
Webb, Sr, James			
Webster, Marvin			
Wheatley, Thomas			
Whitted, Carl			
Williams, James			
Wilson, Howard			

=== Coaches ===
Inductee	Class	Sport	Ref
Mack, James Franklin	1956		

=== Football ===
Inductee	Class	Position	Ref
Bell, Alfred			
Bell, Harold E.			
Black, Joseph			
Bowie, Embra			
Boyd, Gerald Bernard			
Brown, Thomas			
Brown, Kenneth			
Brown, Alvin			
Brown, Roosevelt			
Buckson, Joseph Edward	1959		
Buffaloe, Laurence			
Burdnell, John			
Butler, Jr., J. Hiram			
Byrd, Earl			
Byron, Cyril			
Cain, William			
Campbell, Johnathan			
Caraway Jr., Bruce			
Chester, Raymond			
Clark, Daniel			
Coleridge, William			
Conrad, Thomas			
Cottman, Alphonso			
Couch, Flan			
Cragway, Roy			
Day, Terry			
Drake, Carl			
E. Lawless, Preston			
Elsworth Gordon, William			
Fauntleroy, Arthur			
Ford, Len			
Franks, Elvis			
Frazier, John			
Freeman, William			
Fuqua, John "Frenchy"			
Gaines, Clarence			
Germany, Willie			
Gibbs, James			
Gibson, Joseph			
Givins, Oscar			
Gordon, Frank			
Grimsley, Preston			
Harris, Elmo			
Hasty, Thomas L.			
Henderson, Tillman			
Hick, Raymond			
Hill, Herbert			
Holley, Waymon			
Howard, Ely			
Hurt, Jesse			
Hurt, Eddie P.			
Irvin, Calvin C.			
Jolivet, Arnold M.			
Jolivet, Russell Wesley			
Jones, Willard S.			
Jordan, J. Wilbur			
Kelly, Leroy			
Lampkin, William			
Lanier, Willie			
Latta, Gregory			
Locust, Irvin			
Marse Hill, Talmadge			
Mayo, Ronald			
Morris, Arnold			
Nock, George			
Pompey, Carmie			
Roberts, Richard			
Rooks, George			
Rosedom, George			
Rozier, Jackson			
Ryan, Maceo			
Sade, Kevin Preston			
Smith, Rubin			
Sowell, Richard			
Spaulding, George			
Sterling, Russell			
Sturgis, John			
Thomas, Luther Alonzo			
Triplet, John			
Troupe, Otis			
Turpin, Samuel			
Turpin, Waters			
Turpin, James			
Tyler, Maurice			
Wade, Bob			
Washington, Mark H.			
Waverly, Lawrence			
Webb, Sr, James			
Whaley, Marvin " Stretch"			
Wheatley, Thomas			
Whitted, Carl			
Whittingham, Mitchell	1948		
Wilson, Howard			
Young Jr., Robert Louis			

=== Lacrosse ===
Inductee	Class	Position	Ref
Jackson, Wayne			
Silverman, Howard "Chip", Burton			

=== Swimming ===
Inductee	Class	Event	Ref
Brown, William H.			
Cooper, Cecil			
Fagin, Roy Vincent			
Holt, Reginald			
Montgomery, Lawrence			
1964|			

=== Track and Field ===
Inductee	Class	Event	Ref
Barksdale, Robert			
Bell, Alfred			
Belle, Roberta			
Berry, Robert			
Bethea, John David			
Bowie, Embra			
Bragg, Arthur			
Brown, William			
Brown, James Roland			
Brown, Kelsey Thurlow			
Brown, Hubert			
Buffaloe, Laurence			
Burdnell, John			
Campbell, Johnathan			
Paula Clagon			
Paulette Clagon			
Cole, Walter W. L.			
Cottman, Alphonso			
Couch, Flan			
Culbreath, Josh			
Crews, McKinley			
D. Johnson, Jefferson			
Ellis, Nicholas			
Freeman, William			
Garrison, T. Madison			
Gibbs, James			
Gordon, Frank			
Harris, Elmo			
Harrison, Gerald Oliver			
Hurt, Jesse			
Hurt, Eddie P.			
Jordan, J. Wilbur			
Kave, Kenneth			
LaBeach, Samuel			
McMurray, Robert			
Phipps Morgan, Howard			
Rhoden, George V.			
Ross, Wellington			
Rudolph Gross, Harry			
Smith, Henry			
Smith, Hosea Henry			
Spaulding, George			
Stansbury, Wardell			
Sturgis, John			
Thomas, Luther Alonzo			
Thompson, Lancelot A.			
Triplet, John			
Tyler, Robert			
Whaley, Marvin " Stretch"			
Whitted, Carl			
