= Winston-Salem State Rams men's basketball =

American college basketball team

- University: Winston-Salem State University
- Head coach: Corey Thompson (1st season)
- Location: Winston-Salem, North Carolina
- Arena: C.E. Gaines Center (capacity: 3,200)
- Conference: Central Intercollegiate Athletic Association
- Nickname: Rams
- Colors: Red and white

NCAA Division II tournament champions
- 1967

NCAA Division II tournament Final Four
- 1967

NCAA Division II tournament Elite Eight
- 1967

NCAA Division II tournament Sweet Sixteen
- 1967, 1985, 1999, 2001

NCAA Division II tournament appearances
- 1966, 1967, 1977, 1984, 1985, 1986, 1999, 2000, 2001, 2002, 2005, 2011, 2012, 2013, 2023

Conference tournament champions
- 1953, 1957, 1960, 1961, 1963, 1966, 1970, 1977, 1999, 2000, 2012, 2020, 2023

The Winston-Salem State Rams men's basketball team is the men's basketball team that represents Winston-Salem State University (WSSU) in Winston-Salem, North Carolina, United States. The school's team currently competes in the NCAA Division II Central Intercollegiate Athletic Association. The school won the 1967 NCAA Division II championship. Winston-Salem State competed in Division I from the 2006–07 season to the 2009–10 season as a transitional member of the Mid-Eastern Athletic Conference (MEAC); it returned to Division II in 2010 for financial reasons.

Among its notable coaches was Clarence "Big House" Gaines (1923–2005): during his 47-year tenure at WSSU as coach, professor, and athletic director, his men's basketball team compiled a record of 828–447. Gaines was inducted into the Naismith Memorial Basketball Hall of Fame in 1982.

Noted players under Gaines' era were Earl Monroe, Cleo Hill and sports commentator and columnist Stephen A. Smith. Alumnus Earl Williams, an American-Israeli basketball player, played for the school.

== Postseason ==
=== NCAA Division II ===
The Rams have made the NCAA Division II men's basketball tournament fourteen times. The Rams have a record of 11–16.

Year	Region	Round	Opponent	Result
1966	South	Regional semifinals Regional third place	Oglethorpe; South Carolina State	L 66–69; W 85–81
1967	Mideast	Regional semifinals Regional final National Quarterfinals; National semifinals National Championship	Baldwin–Wallace; Akron; Long Island; Kentucky Wesleyan; SW Missouri State	W 91–76; W 88–80; W 62–54; W 85–73; W 77–74
1977	South Atlantic	Regional semifinals Regional third place	Towson; Virginia Union	L 83–107; L 93–107
1984	South Atlantic	Regional semifinals Regional third place	Norfolk State; Randolph–Macon	L 61–70; L 54–69
1985	South Atlantic	Regional semifinals Regional Final	Virginia Union; Mount St. Mary's	W 44–42; L 56–63
1986	South Atlantic	Regional semifinals Regional third place	Mount St. Mary's; Virginia Union	L 71–74; L 77–95
1999	South Atlantic	First round Regional semifinals Regional Final	Elizabeth City State; Wingate; Lander	W 71–60; W 66–63 ^{OT} L 46–47
2000	South Atlantic	Regional semifinals	Georgia College	L 68–72
2001	South Atlantic	Regional semifinals Regional Final	Augusta State; Johnson C. Smith	W 65–48; L 52–64
2002	South Atlantic	First round Regional semifinals	Wingate; Shaw	W 90–75; L 61–62
2005	South Atlantic	First round	South Carolina Upstate	L 59–63
2011	Atlantic	First round	Shaw	L 47–75
2012	Atlantic	First round	West Virginia Wesleyan	L 54–57
2013	Atlantic	First round	Slippery Rock	L 67–69
2023	Atlantic	First round	Indiana (PA)	L 50–52

== See also ==
- Clarence Gaines College Basketball Coach of the Year Awards
