= 1967 NCAA College Division basketball tournament =

Edition of USA college basketball tournament

- Teams: 36
- Finals site: Roberts Municipal Stadium, Evansville, Indiana
- Champions: Winston-Salem State Rams (1st title)
- Runner-up: SW Missouri State Bears (2nd title game)
- Semifinalists: Kentucky Wesleyan Panthers (4th Final Four); Illinois State Redbirds (1st Final Four)
- Winning coach: Clarence Gaines (1st title)
- MOP: Earl Monroe (Winston-Salem)
- Attendance: 20,608

The 1967 NCAA College Division basketball tournament involved 36 schools playing in a single-elimination tournament to determine the national champion of men's NCAA College Division college basketball as a culmination of the 1966–67 NCAA College Division men's basketball season. It was won by Winston-Salem State University and Winston-Salem's Earl Monroe was the Most Outstanding Player.

1967 NCAA Division II Men's sites - first 2 rounds (white) regionals (cyan) Elite Eight (red)

== Regional participants ==
School	Outcome
American International	Seventh Place*
Assumption	Third Place*
Buffalo State	Seventh Place*
Central Connecticut State	Third Place*
Long Island	Regional Champion
Northeastern	Fifth Place*
Rochester	Fifth Place*
St. Michael's	Runner-up

School	Outcome
Akron	Runner-up
Baldwin–Wallace	Third Place
Mount St. Mary's	Fourth Place
Winston-Salem	Regional Champion

School	Outcome
Cheyney	Regional Champion
Drexel	Fourth Place
Philadelphia Textile	Runner-up
Wagner	Third Place

School	Outcome
Kentucky Wesleyan	Regional Champion
South Carolina State	Runner-up
Stetson	Fourth Place
Tennessee State	Third Place

School	Outcome
Arkansas AM&N	Fourth Place
Arkansas State	Third Place
Lincoln (MO)	Runner-up
SW Missouri State	Regional Champion

School	Outcome
Indiana State	Runner-up
Luther	Third Place
Southern Colorado	Fourth Place
Valparaiso	Regional Champion

School	Outcome
Nevada Southern	Runner-up
Portland State	Fourth Place
San Diego State	Regional Champion
UC Davis	Third Place

School	Outcome
Illinois State	Regional Champion
Louisiana Tech	Runner-up
North Dakota	Third Place
Parsons	Fourth Place

*indicates a tie

== Regionals ==
=== New England ===
First round Round of 36; March 7
Assumption	87***
American International	85
Springfield, MA
St. Michael's	70
Northeastern	61
Central Connecticut State	90
Buffalo State	73
New Britain, CT
Long Island	85
Rochester	76

Regional semifinals Round of 32; March 8
Assumption	63
St. Michael's	77
Central Connecticut State	66
Long Island	114

Regional Final - Springfield, MA; Sweet 16; March 11
St. Michael's	64
Long Island	72

- Consolation- Northeastern 80, American International 53
- Consolation- Rochester 76, Buffalo State 70

=== Mideast - Akron, Ohio ===
Location: Memorial Hall Host: University of Akron

Regional semifinals Round of 32; March 10
Akron	98
Mount St. Mary's	72
Winston-Salem	91
Baldwin–Wallace	76

Regional Final; Sweet 16; March 11
Akron	80
Winston-Salem	88

- Third Place - Baldwin–Wallace 106, Mount St. Mary's 82

=== East - Philadelphia, Pennsylvania ===
Location: Philadelphia Armory Host: Drexel Institute of Technology

Regional semifinals Round of 32; March 10
Philadelphia Textile	90*
Wagner	85
Cheyney	75
Drexel	53

Regional Final; Sweet 16; March 11
Philadelphia Textile	64
Cheyney	80

- Third Place -Wagner 61, Drexel 53

=== South - Evansville, Indiana ===
Location: Roberts Municipal Stadium Host: University of Evansville

Regional semifinals Round of 32; March 9
Kentucky Wesleyan	68
Stetson	55
South Carolina State	66
Tennessee State	59

Regional Final; Sweet 16; March 10
Kentucky Wesleyan	87
South Carolina State	70

- Third Place - Tennessee State 65, Stetson 53

=== Southwest - Springfield, Missouri ===
Location: McDonald Hall and Arena Host: Southwest Missouri State University

Regional semifinals Round of 32; March 10
SW Missouri State	83
Arkansas AM&N	80
Lincoln (MO)	93
Arkansas State	80

Regional Final; Sweet 16; March 11
SW Missouri State	87
Lincoln	77

- Third Place - Arkansas State 105, Arkansas AM&N 93

=== Great Lakes - Terre Haute, Indiana ===
Location: ISU Arena Host: Indiana State University

Regional semifinals Round of 32; March 10
Indiana State	109
Luther	88
Valparaiso	89
Southern Colorado	52

Regional Final; Sweet 16; March 11
Indiana State	77
Valparaiso	80

- Third Place - Luther 99, Southern Colorado 78

=== Pacific Coast - San Diego, California ===
Location: Peterson Gym Host: San Diego State College

Regional semifinals Round of 32; March 10
San Diego State	101
Portland State	73
Nevada Southern	100
UC Davis	83

Regional Final; Sweet 16; March 11
San Diego State	88
Nevada Southern	71

- Third Place - UC Davis 81, Portland State 61

=== Midwest - Normal, Illinois ===
Location: Horton Field House Host: Illinois State University at Normal

Regional semifinals Round of 32; March 10
Louisiana Tech	86
North Dakota	77
Illinois State	72
Parsons	68

Regional Final; Sweet 16; March 11
Louisiana Tech	66
Illinois State	89

- Third Place - North Dakota 107, Parsons 56

*denotes each overtime played

== National Finals - Evansville, Indiana ==
Location: Roberts Municipal Stadium Host: University of Evansville

National Quarterfinals; Elite Eight; March 15
Long Island	54
Winston-Salem	62
Cheyney	53
Kentucky Wesleyan	66
SW Missouri State	86
Valparaiso	72
San Diego State	76
Illinois State	77**

National semifinals Final Four; March 16
Winston-Salem	85
Kentucky Wesleyan	73
SW Missouri State	93
Illinois State	76

National Championship; March 17
Winston-Salem	77
SW Missouri State	74

- Third Place - Kentucky Wesleyan 112, Illinois State 73

*denotes each overtime played

== All-tournament team ==
- Danny Bolden (Southwest Missouri State)
- Earl Monroe (Winston-Salem State)
- Lou Shepherd (Southwest Missouri State)
- Sam Smith (Kentucky Wesleyan)
- Dallas Thornton (Kentucky Wesleyan)

== See also ==
- 1967 NCAA University Division basketball tournament
- 1967 NAIA Basketball Tournament

== Sources ==
- 2010 NCAA Men's Basketball Championship Tournament Records and Statistics: Division II men's basketball Championship
- 1967 NCAA College Division Men's Basketball Tournament jonfmorse.com
