= Raymond Chester =

American football player (born 1948)

- Chester in 1977

No. 87, 88
- Position: Tight end

Personal information
- Born: June 28, 1948 (age 78); Cambridge, Maryland, U.S.
- Listed height: 6 ft 3 in (1.91 m)
- Listed weight: 232 lb (105 kg)

Career information
- High school: Frederick Douglass (Baltimore, Maryland)
- College: Morgan State (1966-1969)
- NFL draft: 1970: 1st round, 24th overall pick

Career history
- Oakland Raiders (1970–1972); Baltimore Colts (1973–1977); Oakland Raiders (1978–1981); Oakland Invaders (1983)

Awards and highlights
- Super Bowl champion (XV); 4× Pro Bowl (1970–1972, 1979); All-USFL (1983)

Career NFL statistics
- Receptions: 364
- Receiving yards: 5,013
- Receiving touchdowns: 48
- Stats at Pro Football Reference

Raymond Tucker Chester (born June 28, 1948) is an American former professional football player who was a tight end in the National Football League (NFL). After graduating from Douglass High School in Baltimore, Chester played college football at the city’s historically Black university Morgan State College (now Morgan State University). He was a member of the Bears' undefeated 1967 team and 8-1 1968 team. Chester scored Morgan State's only touchdown in the Bears’ historic 1968 win over Grambling State University at Yankee Stadium, and his blocked punt leading to a safety was the difference in that 9–7 victory. He has been inducted into the Morgan State University Athletic Hall of Fame, the Maryland Athletic Hall of Fame, the Central Intercollegiate Athletic Association Hall of Fame, and the Black College Football Hall of Fame.

Drafted as the 24th pick overall in the first round of the 1970 NFL draft, Chester began his NFL career with the Oakland Raiders. Seven touchdown catches and over five hundred receiving yards earned Chester the Rookie of the Year award by the Newspaper Enterprise Association (NEA) and secured the first of four career Pro Bowl selections. A trade in 1973 to the Baltimore Colts led to five seasons with them, and three playoff appearances, before returning to Oakland. In 1979, Chester led all NFL tight ends in pass receptions (58). He played a significant role during the 1980 Raiders' four victory playoff run with 12 receptions, ending with the Super Bowl XV championship.

Chester played one more season with the Raiders (1981), and after not playing in 1982, he played a single-season in 1983 for the Oakland Invaders of the United States Football League (USFL), before becoming an executive with that team.

== Early life ==
Chester was born in Cambridge, Maryland, on June 28, 1948, to Ivy and Bertha Chester, and was the fourth of ten siblings. He grew up in Baltimore. As a child, he did not have enough money to attend Baltimore Colts' football games, but he would find rides to the Colts' training camp in Westminster, Maryland, where he watched players like Johnny Unitas, Raymond Berry, and Lenny Moore, among others. During his years at Frederick Douglass High School in Baltimore, Chester excelled in track, wrestling, and football. He played both offensive and defensive tackle on the football team. He set a Maryland Scholastic Association (MSA) shot put record in 1966. He also set an MSA discus throwing record at Douglass.

In 1964, Chester received the McCormick Unsung Hero Award; and in 1966, he was among 36 students honored as scholar athletes.

== College career ==
Chester attended Morgan State College (now Morgan State University) playing football for the Bears under the guidance of future College Football Hall of Fame head coach Earl Banks. Chester was originally going to attend the University of Maryland, where he would have played tackle; but Banks told Chester if he came to Morgan State then Banks would make him a tight end. At Morgan State, Chester played tight end on offense and defensive end on defense, as well as linebacker and running back during his college football career. Banks considered Chester the best all-around player he had coached at Morgan State, which included among others future Hall of Fame players Leroy Kelley and Willie Lanier; observing that Chester did more things for the team than Kelley did. In college, the 6 ft 3 in (1.91 m) 225 lb (102.1 kg) Chester ran the 40–yard dash in 4.6 seconds.

As a sophomore in 1967 Chester had leg cramping issues that limited his playing time. As a junior in 1968 Chester had 20 pass receptions for 500 yards, with four touchdowns. The Bears had an 8–1 record that year. Chester's 1968 teammates included future NFL players John "Frenchy" Fuqua and George Nock. As a senior in 1969, he caught 35 passes, with eight touchdowns and a 16-yards per catch average. He also ran back a kickoff 70 yards for a touchdown during his college career. Overall at Morgan State, Chester caught 80 passes.

Chester played for the Bears during part of their 31–game unbeaten streak (1964 to 1968). The streak included three seasons where the Bears were undefeated (1965 to 1967). On September 28, 1968, Chester played a key role in the match-up between Morgan State and Grambling State. The historic game was the first of its kind, pitting two historically black colleges against each other on one of the largest stages of that era—Yankee Stadium. It was the first time two historically black colleges or universities played each other in New York City. More than 60,000, or 64,000, people attended the nationally televised game. (Morgan had earlier been the first team to integrate the Tangerine Bowl in 1966). In 2011, CBS Sports produced a documentary on the social importance of the 1968 game between Morgan State and Grambling.

In the game against Grambling, Chester caught a 52-yard touchdown pass for Morgan State’s only touchdown, leading to the Bears’ ultimate 9–7 victory over the Tigers; the Bears' 27th consecutive victory. He also blocked a punt that led to a safety, thus having a hand in all of Morgan State's points. As a defensive end in that game, Chester had three quarterback sacks.

Chester was selected as an All-American twice. Chester received honorable mention as a Little All-American from the Associated Press (AP) in 1968, and was named a Little All-American in 1969. The Baltimore Sun named Chester its 1968 Maryland College Division All-Star at tight end. Chester was selected to play in the 1970 Chicago Charities College All-Star Game. While training with other college all-stars to prepare for the game, Chester realized none of them were better players than he was, giving him confidence going into his professional career.

While at Morgan State, Chester also threw the shot put, and won a wrestling championship.

== Professional career ==
=== Oakland Raiders ===
==== 1970 to 1972 ====
Chester was selected with the 24th pick in the first round of the 1970 NFL draft by the Oakland Raiders' legendary owner Al Davis. He and Davis remained close friends until the latter’s death in 2011. The Raiders began scouting Davis in 1967, when he was a sophomore at Morgan State. The Raiders intended to make the versatile Chester their first draft pick in 1970, with the only issue being what position to play him in as a professional; finally deciding he would be best at tight end. After seeing Chester in their 1970 training camp, he was named starting tight end in his rookie season.

As a rookie Chester immediately contributed to the Raiders. He had 42 receptions, 556 receiving yards, and seven touchdowns. His performance earned him his first of four Pro Bowl selections (1970 to 1972, 1979). The Newspaper Enterprise Association (NEA) named Chester its NFL Rookie of the Year, and he was third in the Associated Press' (AP) rookie of the year voting. United Press International (UPI) named him second-team All-AFC. The Raiders were 8–4–2 that season, finishing first in the American Football Conference (AFC) West Division; ultimately reaching the AFC championship game. Chester had two receptions for 47 years in the Raiders' first-round playoff win over the Miami Dolphins; and two receptions for 36 yards in the Raiders' AFC championship game loss to the Baltimore Colts.

Chester started all 14 games in his second season, with 28 receptions for 442 yards and seven touchdowns. He was selected to the Pro Bowl for the second consecutive season. He was named first-team All-AFC by Pro Football Weekly and The Sporting News, and UPI again named him second-team All-AFC. Chester started 11 games in 1972, with 34 receptions for 576 yards and eight touchdowns. He was selected to play in the Pro Bowl for a third consecutive season. The Associated Press, Sporting News, and UPI all named Chester first-team All-AFC. He had three receptions for 40 yards in the Raiders' 1972 playoff loss to the Pittsburgh Steelers in what is known as the "Immaculate Reception" game; his former Morgan State teammate John Fuqua playing a critical role in the game's controversial ending.

In July 1973, the Raiders traded Chester to the Baltimore Colts for defensive end Bubba Smith, who had missed the 1972 season with an injury; but had been an All-Pro player before the injury. Colts' general manager Joe Thomas said at the time "'We had a chance to get possibly the best tight end in football . . . And we had to give up a good football player'".

==== 1978 to 1981 ====
Chester returned to the Raiders after being traded along with a 1979 second-round pick (33rd overall–traded to Tampa Bay Buccaneers for Dave Pear) from the Colts for Mike Siani and a 1979 third-round selection (72nd overall–traded to Houston Oilers), on July 21, 1978. He did not start any games in 1978, and had 13 receptions for 146 yards and two touchdowns, playing as a reserve behind All-Pro tight end Dave Casper.

The Raiders started both Casper and Chester in 1979. Chester had his best NFL season that year, with 712 reception yards and eight touchdowns, while leading all NFL tight ends with 58 receptions. He was named to the Pro Bowl for the fourth time (along with Casper). Chester was named first-team All-Pro by the Newspaper Enterprise Association, and second-team All-AFC by UPI.

Chester had surgery on an oft-injured knee in early August 1980. He started 10 games that season, after the Raiders traded Dave Casper to the Houston Oilers during the season. Chester had 28 receptions for 336 yards and four touchdowns. The Raiders defeated the Oilers in the wild card round of the 1980–81 playoffs. Chester had two receptions in that game. The Raiders then defeated the Cleveland Browns in the divisional round, 14–12, Chester gaining 64 yards on three receptions. Chester had five receptions for 102 yards in the Raiders' 34–27 AFC championship game win over the San Diego Chargers. On the game's third play Chester caught a deflected Jim Plunkett pass on the 50-yard line and then ran for a touchdown, on a 65-yard scoring play. Chester became a Super Bowl champion when the Raiders next defeated the Philadelphia Eagles in Super Bowl XV, 27–10, Chester catching two passes for 24 yards.

Chester started only five games in 1981, with 13 receptions. He was replaced at starting tight end by Derrick Ramsey in mid-October. The Raiders waived Chester before the start of the 1982 season. He believed part of the team's reasoning in waiving him was wanting to start anew in moving to Los Angeles that season.

In seven seasons with the Raiders, Chester started 65 games, with 216 receptions for 2,891 yards (13.4 yards per receptions) and 37 receiving touchdowns.

=== Baltimore Colts (1973 to 1977) ===
Chester was acquired by his hometown Colts for Bubba Smith on July 16, 1973. In 1973, he started 10 games for the 4–10 Colts, with 18 receptions for 181 yards. In 1974, the Colts record fell to 2–12. Chester started all 14 games, with 37 receptions for 461 yards; leading all of the Colts' offensive ends in both categories (and second only to running back Lydell Mitchell). In the Colts' final game that season, Chester had eight receptions for 102 yards and one touchdown. In 1975, third-year quarterback Bert Jones started all 14 games for the first time in his Colts' career. Chester started 14 games again for the Colts that season, with 38 receptions (third best on the team) for 458 yards and three touchdowns. The Colts had a 10–4 record, winning the AFC East Division.

The Colts won the AFC East Division again in 1976 with an 11–3 record. Chester had 24 receptions for 467 yards and three touchdowns. Chester had three receptions for 42 yards in the Colts' divisional round playoff loss to the Pittsburgh Steelers that season. In his final Colts' season (1977), the Colts again won the AFC East Division with a 10–4 record. Chester had 31 receptions for 556 yards, leading all of the team's offensive ends; and three touchdowns. In Chester's last regular season game as a Colt he caught four passes for 122 yards, including a 78-yard touchdown reception from Jones. On December 24, 1977, the Colts lost to the Raiders in the divisional round of the playoffs, 37–31, in what is known as the "Ghost to the Post" game; Chester having one reception for 30 yards.

During Chester's five seasons with the Colts he started 66 games with 148 receptions, 2,122 yards receiving (14.3 yards per reception), and 11 touchdowns. An outstanding blocker, it was reported that Chester often drew criticism during his years with the Colts for dropped passes; and Colt coach Ted Marchibroda said Chester never wanted to be with the Colts since joining the team in 1973. Chester himself said he had been content playing for the Colts until the 1977 season, when a conflict developed between him and two other people of significance with the Colts; stating "'Things in Baltimore were beautiful. But a situation arose between me and two other people in strategic positions that made it hard for me to concentrate. I can't change it and I can't ignore it'".

=== USFL ===
Chester did not play professional football in 1982. In early December 1982, he signed to play with the Oakland Invaders of the United States Football League (USFL). The USFL consisted of 18 teams. Chester played a single season with the Invaders, in 1983. He caught 68 passes for 951 yards and five touchdowns. The team won the Pacific division; and Chester earned All-USFL honors and the USFL Man of the Year award. He announced his retirement in December 1983; and then became the Invaders' vice-president of communications and marketing.

== Legacy and honors ==
In 2004, Chester was inducted into the Morgan State University Athletic Hall of Fame. He is a member of the Maryland Athletic Hall of Fame as well as the Central Intercollegiate Athletic Association Hall of Fame. In 2018, Chester was inducted into the Black College Football Hall of Fame. In 2016, he was inducted into the Bay Area Sports Hall of Fame.

After being drafted into the NFL, Morgan State coach Earl Banks believed Chester had the potential to equal future Baltimore Colts' Hall of Fame tight end John Mackey. In 2014, a campaign was launched by the Black Sports Legends Foundation to get Chester elected to the Pro Football Hall of Fame as well. At that time, Chester said: "I think it’s time that the Hall of Fame selection committee go back and recognize some of the guys who were absolutely the best player in their era...And no one can dispute that I was one of the top three players at my position in my era. No one can dispute that". In addition to his blocking ability and pass catching ability over the middle of the field as a tight end, Chester was one of the first NFL tight ends to excel as a receiver on deep passing plays; and was one of the tight ends playing a role in transforming the position in that regard. In 2005, former All-Pro tight end Russ Francis listed Chester among his top-five tight ends in NFL history. Chester finished his 12-year NFL career playing in 172 games, with 364 receptions, 5,013 yards (13.8 yards per catch), and 48 touchdowns.

== NFL career statistics ==
Legend
**Bold**	Career high

=== Regular season ===
Year	Team	Games		Receiving				
Year	Team	GP	GS	Rec	Yds	Avg	Lng	TD
1970	OAK	14	12	42	556	13.2	43	7
1971	OAK	14	**14**	28	442	15.8	67	7
1972	OAK	13	11	34	576	16.9	68	**8**
1973	BAL	13	10	18	181	10.1	40	1
1974	BAL	14	**14**	37	461	12.5	45	1
1975	BAL	14	**14**	38	457	12.0	32	3
1976	BAL	14	**14**	24	467	**19.5**	48	3
1977	BAL	14	**14**	31	556	17.9	**78**	3
1978	OAK	**16**	0	13	146	11.2	27	2
1979	OAK	14	13	**58**	**712**	12.3	39	**8**
1980	OAK	**16**	10	28	366	13.1	47	4
1981	OAK	**16**	5	13	93	7.2	15	1
		172	131	364	5,013	13.8	78	48

=== Playoffs ===
Year	Team	Games		Receiving				
Year	Team	GP	GS	Rec	Yds	Avg	Lng	TD
1970	OAK	2	2	4	83	20.8	35	0
1972	OAK	1	1	3	40	13.3	19	0
1975	BAL	1	1	0	0	0.0	0	0
1976	BAL	1	1	3	42	14.0	24	0
1977	BAL	1	1	1	30	**30.0**	30	0
1980	OAK	**4**	**4**	**12**	**202**	16.8	**65**	**1**
		10	10	23	397	17.3	65	1

== Personal life ==
Chester lived in Oakland during the offseason, even when playing for the Colts; and continued living there with his wife Sharon and their three children after retirement. During his NFL career, Chester, along with NFL players MacArthur Lane and Sherman White, formed a charitable organization, Pros For Oakland. The group, with donations from professional athletes of money and time, provided athletes as public speakers and to run sports clinics for youth; and in one instance 25 professionals were present to support 850 children competing in the Special Olympics.

An avid golfer, Chester managed the Lake Chabot Golf Course for 20 years. Currently he acts as a consultant for golf course development and management.

He also held an executive position for the Raiders coordinating ticket sales.
