= Hill Field House =

Building in Maryland, United States

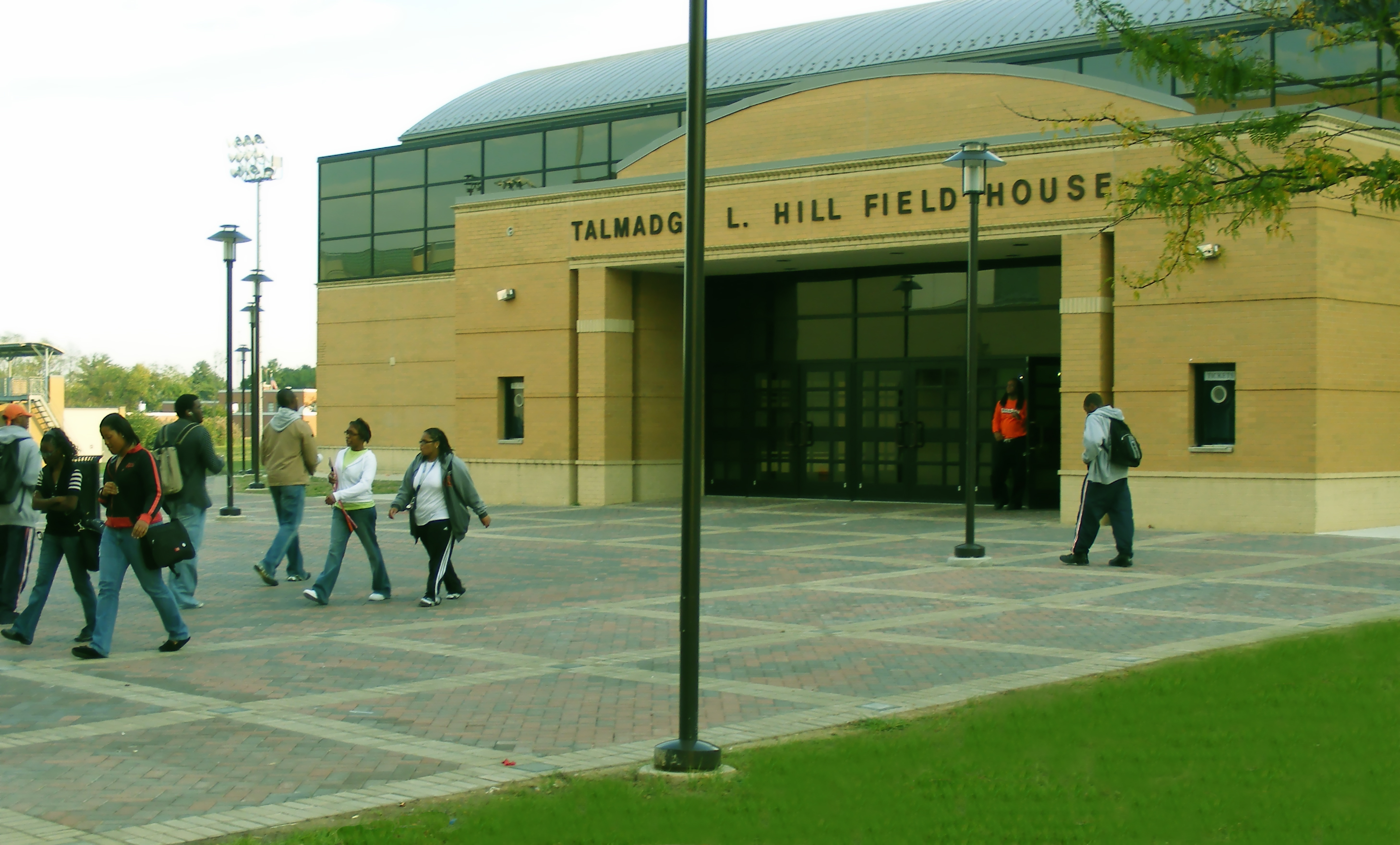
- Field House Exterior, October 2007
- Interactive map of Hill Field House
- Full name: Talmadge L. Hill Field House
- Address: 1700 East Cold Spring Lane
- Location: Baltimore, Maryland
- Coordinates: 39°20′33″N 76°35′6″W
- Capacity: 4,250
- Surface: Hardwood

Construction
- Opened: 1974

Tenants
- Morgan State Bears (NCAA) (1974–present)

Talmadge L. Hill Field House is a 4,250-seat multi-purpose arena in Baltimore, Maryland. It was opened in 1974, replacing Hurt Gymnasium, and is named for former Morgan State Bears men's basketball coach Talmadge L. Hill. It is home to the Morgan State University Bears men's basketball and women's basketball teams and women's volleyball team. It hosted the MEAC men's basketball tournament in 1994 and 1995.

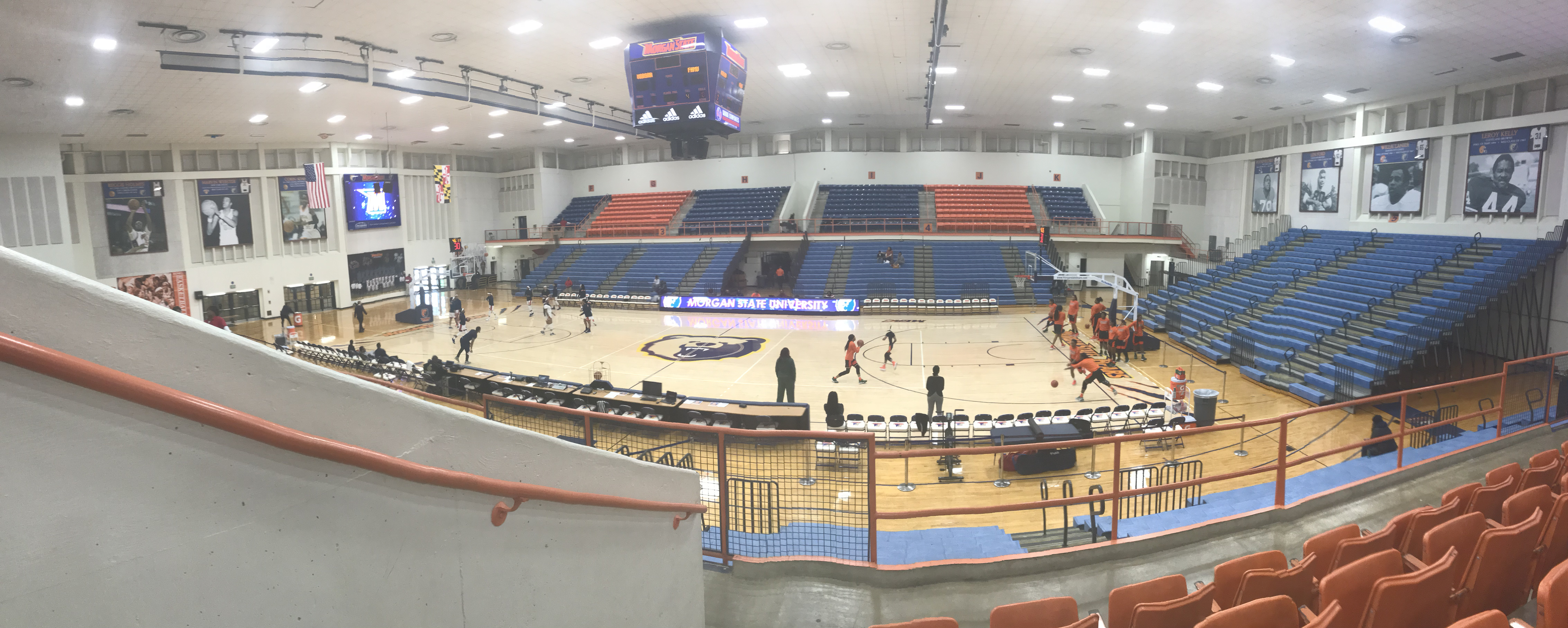
The interior of Hill Field House in January 2018.

== See also ==
- List of NCAA Division I basketball arenas
