= Talmadge Hill =

American football player and coach (1902–1982)

Biographical details
- Born: May 19, 1902; East Orange, New Jersey, U.S.
- Died: March 8, 1982 (aged 79); Baltimore, Maryland, U.S.

Playing career

Football
- 1924–1927: Morgan State

Coaching career (HC unless noted)

Basketball
- 1948–1960: Morgan State

Head coaching record
- Overall: 149–128

Accomplishments and honors

Championships
- 2 CIAA (1949, 1956)

Talmadge Layman "Marse" Hill (May 19, 1902 – March 8, 1982) was the head basketball coach and an assistant football coach at Morgan State College, from the 1930s to the 1960s.

== Early life ==
Hill was born in East Orange, New Jersey. He graduated from Morgan State College—now known as Morgan State University in 1928. Hill played college football for the Morgan State Bears. In a game versus Lincoln, he was tackled by a player from Lincoln's bench as he was streaking down the sideline for the apparent winning touchdown. Morgan eventually was awarded the touchdown and won the game. After his career at Morgan, Hill earned a master's degree at Columbia University and then returned to Morgan as a teacher and assistant coach in 1930. Hill was hired as a professor and taught biology.

== Coaching career ==
Early in his coaching career at Morgan, Hill was the assistant to Edward P. Hurt in football, basketball and track. He took over head coaching responsibilities for the basketball team in 1948 and served as the head coach until 1960. Hill was described as a conservative coach and one who did not like "fancy" ball handlers playing for him.

== Late life and death ==
Hill retired from coaching in 1964 and was named professor emeritus of health and physical education in 1972. He died on March 8, 1982, at Provident Hospital in Baltimore, after suffering a series of strokes.

== Head coaching record ==
Year	Wins	Losses	Highlites
1948	15	9	
1949	6	9	
1950	13	11	
1951	6	13	
1952	10	13	
1953	17	10	
1954	15	5	
1955	13	14	
1956	17	11	
1957	9	10	
1958	11	8	
1959	11	4	
1960	5	11	
CAREER TOTAL	149	128	

== Awards and honors ==
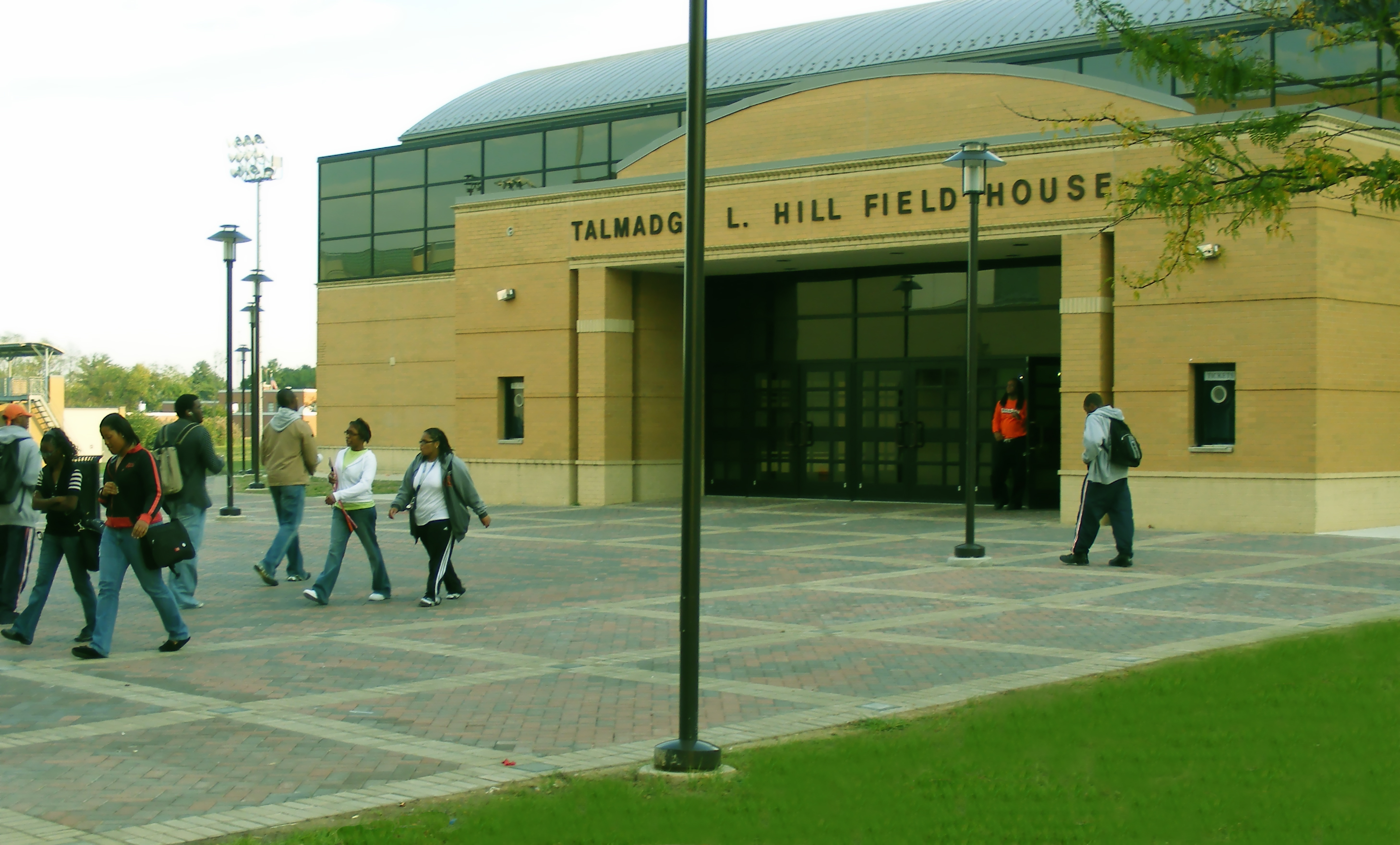
The Talmadge L. Hill Fieldhouse on the campus of Morgan State University

- 1969: named to the Maryland Commission on Physical Fitness
- 1972: elected to the Morgan State University Athletic Hall of Fame
- 1974: Morgan State University field house (pictured) named in his honor
- 1975: inducted into The Pigskin Club Hall of Washington, D.C. Hall of Fame
- 1978: inducted into the HBCU Hall of Fame
- Chairman of the Mid-Eastern Athletic Conference (MEAC) Steering and Planning Committee and the league's first president
- The MEAC men's all-sports award is named for Hill
