= Robin Lundberg =

American sports broadcaster (born 1981)

- Born: August 30, 1981 (age 44)
- Education: B.A. in Journalism; University of Maryland College Park
- Occupation: Content Provider/Talk show host
- Years active: 2006–present
- Employer(s): Sports Illustrated, CBS Sports Radio
- Spouse: Depeka Rampertaap
- Children: Raj, Rani and Rohan
- Website: https://www.robinlundberg.com/

Robin D. Lundberg (born August 30, 1981) is an American sports broadcaster. He can be seen as host of Sports Illustrated's daily videos and heard on his own CBS Sports Radio show as well as SiriusXM. Lundberg formerly spent a decade with ESPN, most recently as the co-host (with Mike Golic, Jr.) of First and Last weekdays 4 to 6 a.m. on ESPN Radio.

== Career ==
His first job was as an ESPN intern for Around the Horn. After that, he worked as a broadcast associate for I, Max on Fox Sports network. In May 2006, he was hired by ESPN Radio. He began as a producer on The Stephen A. Smith Show. He then was producer of The Max Kellerman Show with Max Kellerman, where he served as on-air researcher and comedian. Next was The Leadoff Spot with Ryan Ruocco. He also acted as a co-host on The Leadoff Spot and Ruocco and Lundberg. In September 2012, he was officially a host of his own radio show called The Robin Lundberg Show from weekdays 4 to 6 a.m. on ESPN Radio. Lundberg is currently the host of SI Now for Sports Illustrated weekdays at 10:30 a.m. and The Robin Lundberg Show on CBS Sports Radio Saturdays 6 to 10 a.m.
