= Stephen A. Smith =

American TV personality (born 1967)

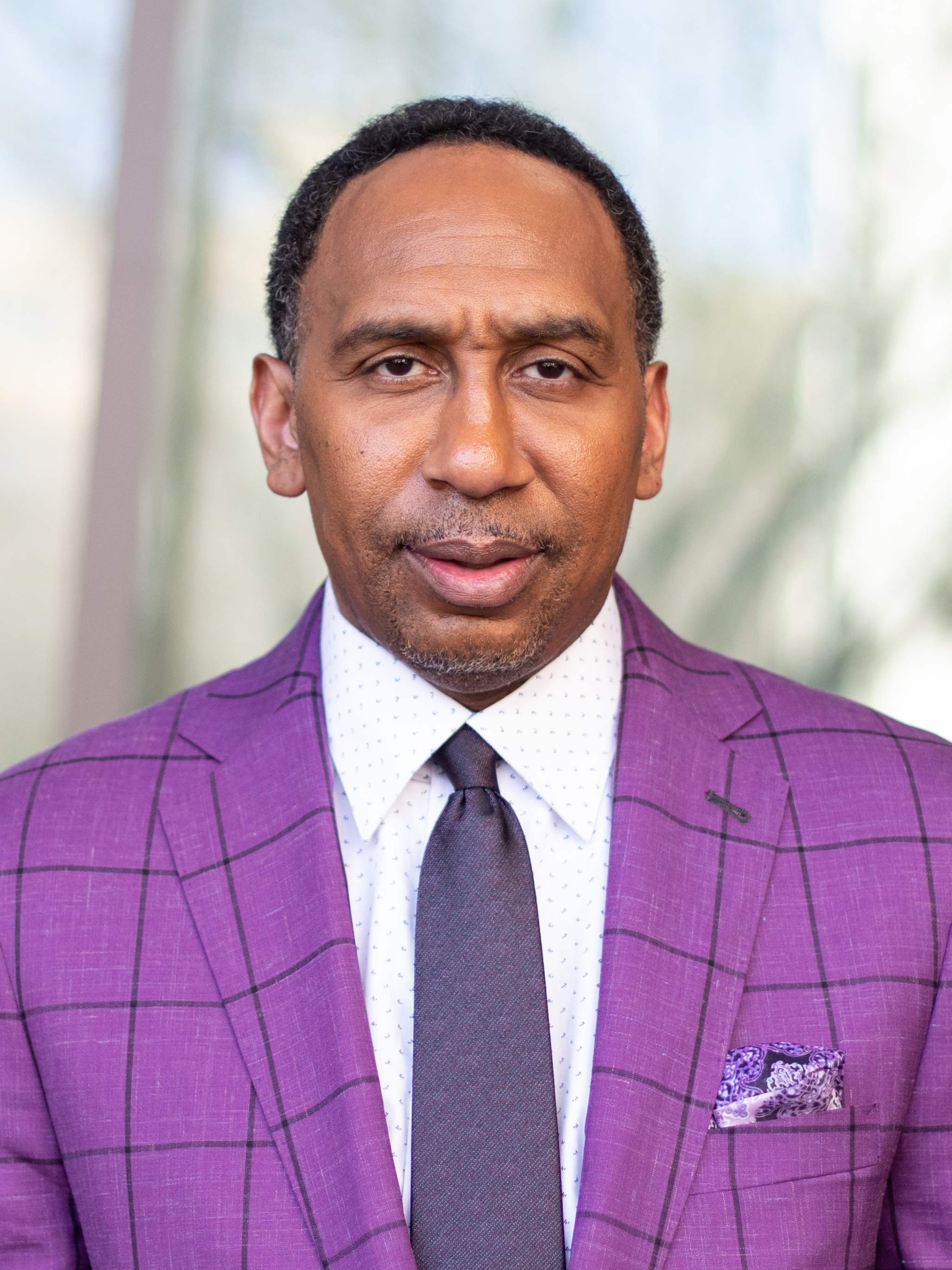
- Smith in 2023
- Born: Stephen Anthony Smith; October 14, 1967 (age 59); New York City, U.S.
- Education: Winston-Salem State University (BA)
- Occupations: Sports television personality; sports radio host; sports journalist; actor
- Employer(s): The Philadelphia Inquirer (1994–2010); ESPN Inc. (2003–present); SiriusXM (2025–present)
- Political party: Independent (Note: Smith is a registered independent. In February 2025, he stated on his podcast, The Stephen A. Smith Show, that he would entertain the idea of launching a presidential campaign as a Democrat. His comments came after he was included in a Democratic primary nationwide poll, where he received 2%. He later walked back some of these comments in February, saying that he was not interested in running for president. In April 2025, he said that he has "no choice" but to consider a presidential bid.)
- Children: 2
- Basketball career

Career information
- High school: Thomas A. Edison (Queens, New York)
- College: Winston-Salem (1987–1991)
- Position: Point guard / shooting guard

Stephen Anthony Smith (born October 14, 1967) is an American television personality, radio host, sports analyst, political commentator, and actor. He makes frequent appearances as an NBA analyst for ESPN on SportsCenter, NBA Countdown, and the network's NBA broadcasts. He has also hosted The Stephen A. Smith Show on ESPN Radio and is a commentator on ESPN's First Take. Smith is a featured columnist for ESPN and The Philadelphia Inquirer.

== Early life and education ==
Stephen Anthony Smith was born in the Bronx, a borough of New York City. He was raised in the Hollis section of Queens. Smith is the youngest of six children. He has four older sisters and had an older brother, Basil, who died in a car accident in 1992. He also has a half-brother on his father's side. Smith's parents were originally from Saint Thomas, U.S. Virgin Islands. His father managed a hardware store. Smith's maternal grandmother was white, the rest of his grandparents black. He graduated in 1986 from Thomas Edison High School in Queens.

After attending the Fashion Institute of Technology for one year, Smith received a basketball scholarship to attend Winston-Salem State University, a historically black university in Winston-Salem, North Carolina. He played for the Winston-Salem State Rams men's basketball team under Hall of Fame coach Clarence Gaines. However, Smith's basketball career abruptly ended after a severe knee injury. While still on the team, Smith wrote a column for the university newspaper, The News Argus, arguing Gaines should retire due to health issues. He is a member of the Omega Psi Phi fraternity. Smith graduated in 1991 with a Bachelor of Arts degree in mass communication.

== Career ==
=== Print media ===
Smith began his print media career while still in college working for the Winston-Salem Journal as the beat writer for the Wake Forest University Demon Deacons soccer team. He later worked for the Greensboro News and Record and the New York Daily News. Beginning in 1994, Smith had a position as a writer for The Philadelphia Inquirer. He began reporting on the Philadelphia 76ers as their NBA columnist, and eventually, as a general sports columnist. On August 23, 2007, the Inquirer announced that Smith would no longer be writing columns and would instead be demoted back to the position of general assignment reporter. In 2008, the Inquirer ended its relationship with Smith, which coincided with Smith starting his own blog, stephena.com. In February 2010, Smith returned to The Philadelphia Inquirer after winning an arbitrator's ruling that he was to be reinstated but having to agree to remove all of his political views from his website and from cable news shows.

=== Radio ===
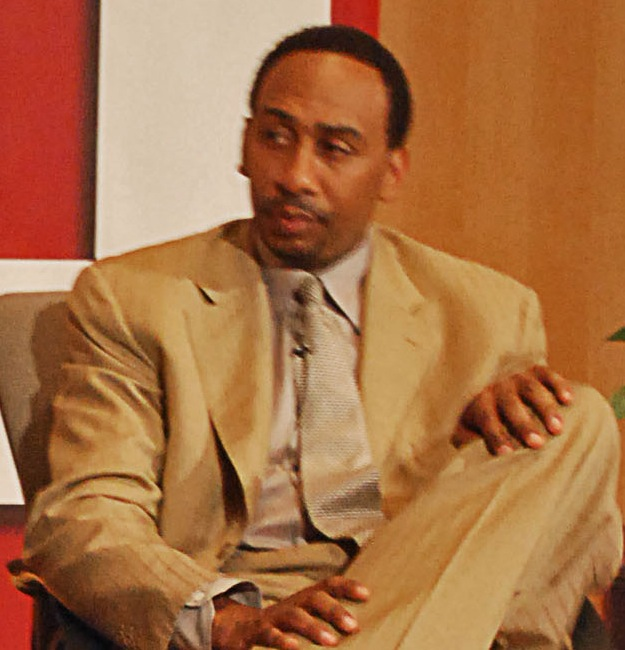
Smith in 2009

On April 11, 2005, Smith became the host of a weekday noon to 2 p.m. radio show on WEPN in New York City with his "right-hand man B.T. (Brandon Tierney)". On September 20, 2007, the show was shifted to the 2–4 p.m. slot, with the second hour being broadcast nationally on ESPN Radio, replacing the third hour of The Dan Patrick Show (Mike Tirico took over the first two hours). Smith's show came to an end in April 2008 as he sought to expand his career in television, and beginning May 1, Scott Van Pelt began hosting in the 3–4 p.m. hour that was previously Smith's. In November 2009, Smith became an on-air contributor to Fox Sports Radio and broke the story of Allen Iverson's retirement on the Chris Myers–Steve Hartman afternoon show on November 25. Iverson later ended his short retirement and rejoined the Philadelphia 76ers on December 2. Smith became a Fox Sports Radio morning show host on January 4, 2010, replacing Washington, D.C.–based host Steve Czaban. On his radio program, Smith correctly predicted that LeBron James, Dwyane Wade, and Chris Bosh would all sign with the Miami Heat during 2010 free agency.

In early 2011, Smith became a resident FSR NBA insider and ended his morning show. ESPN announced on February 1, 2011 that Smith would return to ESPN as a columnist for ESPN.com and host for weekday local radio shows on 1050 ESPN Radio New York (WEPN-AM) at 7–9 p.m. ET as well as 710 ESPN Radio Los Angeles (KSPN-AM) at 6–8 p.m. PT. He left LA 710 ESPN on April 24, 2012. Beginning in May 2012, as part of the ESPN New York move to 98.7 WRKS, Smith replaced Robin Lundberg alongside Ryan Ruocco and debuted the Stephen A. Smith & Ryan Ruocco Show which ran from 1–3 p.m. ET on the new 98.7 WEPN. Smith started each show with a signature pre-intro cold open "rant" on a topic that would be discussed in the first segment. The show came to an end in the summer of 2013, when Smith left ESPN for Sirius XM Radio, where he joined Chris Russo's Mad Dog Sports Channel. The move was announced just one day after Smith made some controversial comments on ESPN2's First Take program regarding the Ray Rice situation. On January 17, 2017, Smith moved from Sirius XM's Mad Dog Sports channel back to ESPN. His daily two-hour program is heard on WEPN in New York, KSPN in Los Angeles, Sirius XM's ESPN channel, and via syndication.

=== Television ===
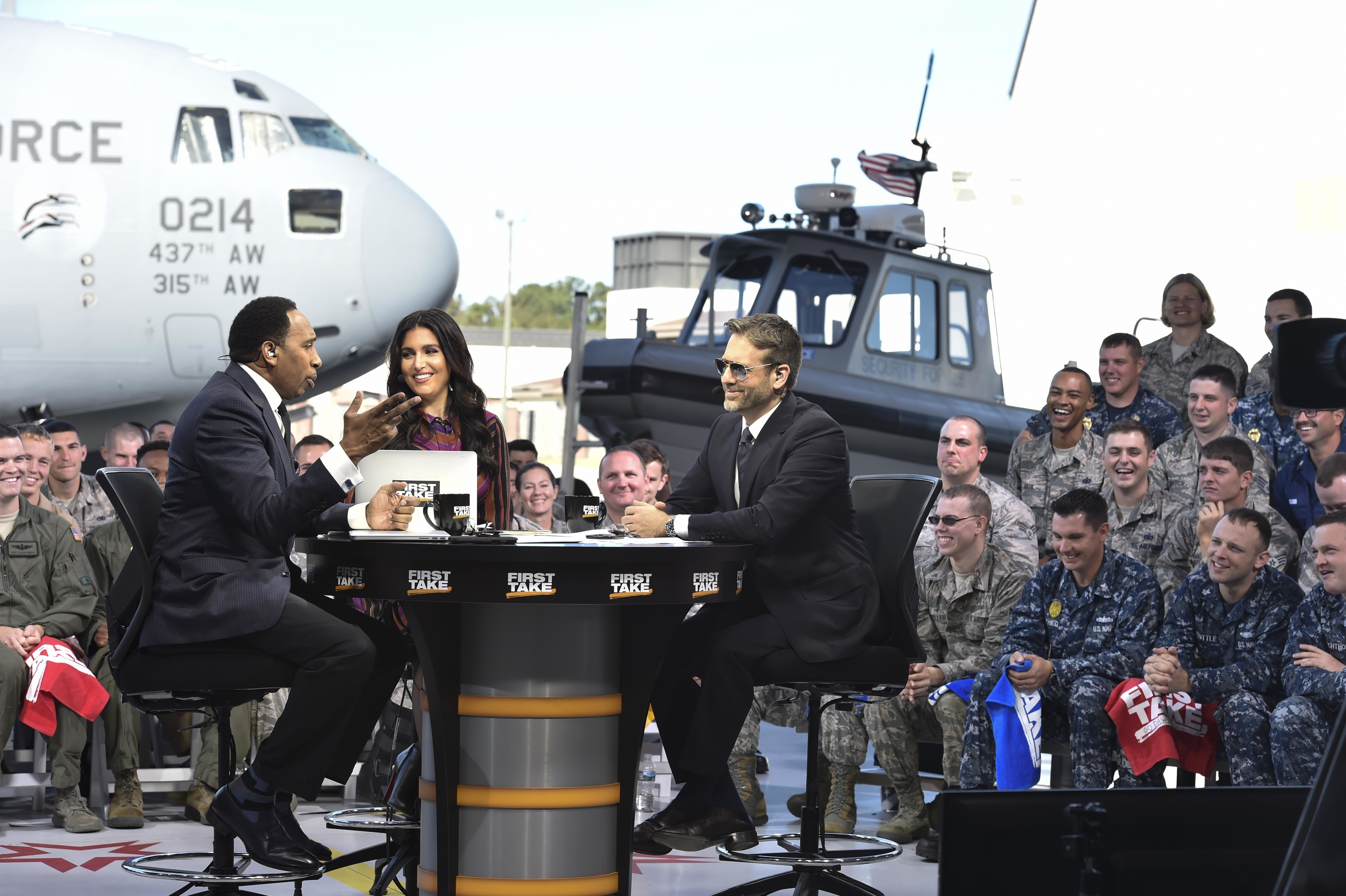
Smith at a 2016 First Take filming at Joint Base Charleston

Smith is one of the hosts of First Take on ESPN. He also appears as an analyst on various ESPN programs. He is known for provocative analysis and dour delivery. Smith started his television career on the now-defunct cable network CNN/SI in 1999. In August 2005, Smith started hosting a daily hour-long show on ESPN called Quite Frankly with Stephen A. Smith. After the show was cancelled in January 2007, he mainly concentrated on basketball, serving as an NBA analyst. He also appeared on other ESPN shows, including the reality series Dream Job, as well as serving as a frequent guest (and guest host) on Pardon the Interruption, Jim Rome Is Burning, and as a participant on 1st and 10. He appeared as an anchor on the Sunday morning edition of SportsCenter. On April 17, 2009, Smith announced on his website that he would be leaving ESPN on May 1, 2009. The Los Angeles Times reported that ESPN commented that, "We decided to move in different directions." Though according to Big Lead Sports, a source says that ESPN and Smith went to the negotiating table and could not reach an agreement.

Smith later returned to ESPN, and it was announced on April 30, 2012, on air that Smith would be joining First Take on a permanent, five-days-per-week basis under a new format for the show called "Embrace Debate" in which he squares off against longtime First Take commentator Skip Bayless. On July 25, 2014, Smith made controversial remarks on First Take that women may provoke domestic abuse, in regards to the domestic violence situation involving Baltimore Ravens' running back Ray Rice and his wife. After criticism of the remarks, including comments on Twitter from ESPN reporter Michelle Beadle, Smith apologized for his words on a taped segment on ESPN. On July 29, 2014, Smith was suspended by ESPN for a week and did not appear on any of their programs again until August 6, 2014.

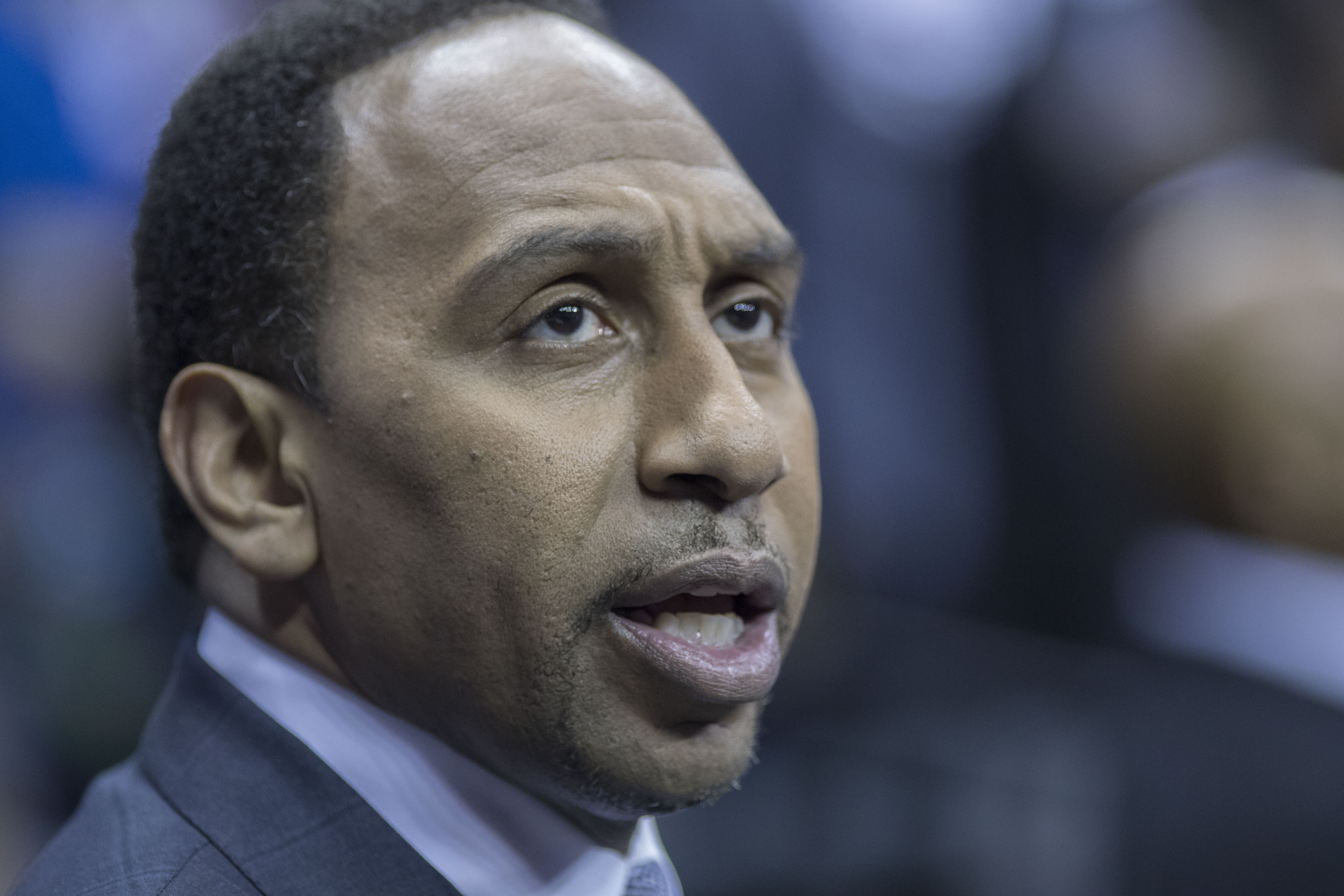
Smith in 2017

In late 2014, Smith signed a multi-year deal with ESPN paying him over $3 million per year. In a March 9, 2015, episode of First Take, while discussing the topic of Philadelphia Eagles' head coach Chip Kelly trading away running back LeSean McCoy to the Buffalo Bills for linebacker Kiko Alonso, Smith said: "Chip Kelly has made decisions over the last couple of years that, dare I say, leave a few brothers feeling uncomfortable." Michael David Smith of NBC Sports believed that Smith had hinted Kelly's roster moves regarding the 2014 release of wide receiver DeSean Jackson, the McCoy trade, and letting wide receiver Jeremy Maclin depart for free agency to sign with the Kansas City Chiefs, while still keeping wide receiver Riley Cooper on the Eagles' roster might be racially motivated. In an interview with ESPN The Magazine that was published on May 8, 2015, McCoy admitted that while he respected Kelly as a head coach, he did not see eye to eye with him. McCoy also believed that some of the roster moves that are being made by Kelly are racially motivated. Kelly has said that the roster moves that he has made have nothing to do with race, it has to do with finding the right players that fit well into his team. Smith defended his comments by saying that he never used a form of the word racism to imply that Kelly was a racist.

On June 11, 2015, Smith received criticism for a comment he made about female soccer players during the 2015 FIFA Women's World Cup. While on SportsCenter, a replay was shown of a goal scored by Norway on a free kick against Germany. Tim Legler pointed out that the German players forming the wall turned their heads as the ball went by, and Smith joked that the players "might not have wanted to mess up their hair". Smith's comment was criticized as being sexist and a poor joke. ESPN said they spoke with Smith about the comment, and he later apologized in a series of tweets.

On November 5, 2016, Smith joined Top Rank's broadcasting team for the Manny Pacquiao vs. Jessie Vargas boxing pay-per-view event. In 2019, Smith signed a new contract with ESPN worth approximately $60 million over five years. In 2019, Smith became a UFC commentator as ESPN became the UFC's television broadcaster. In 2020, Smith served as a commentator for the after-party coverage of the 92nd Academy Awards on ABC. On June 10, 2021, Smith broke into the soccer coverage space. (As he put it, "Let's do that soccer.") Smith selected a Euro 2020 team and followed this up with another soccer segment called "Ain't No Way" on June 14, 2021. In 2025, Smith signed a new contract with ESPN worth over $100 million over five years. He also signed a contract with SiriusXM worth $36 million over three years.

=== Acting ===
Smith made his acting debut on the ABC soap opera General Hospital in a cameo appearance as a television reporter on February 2, 2007. Smith is a longtime fan of the show, as his older sisters watched it every day growing up. Smith appeared as Brick on General Hospital on March 31, 2016, and has made guest appearances in the role every year since.

In 2007, Smith was in the Chris Rock film I Think I Love My Wife. Beginning in 2014, he has appeared in a series of Oberto all-natural beef jerky commercials as "The Little Voice in Your Stomach", each time appearing alongside sports figures, such as star athletes Seattle Seahawks cornerback Richard Sherman and pro snowboarder Louie Vito, and notable basketball sportscaster Dick "Dickie V" Vitale. Smith has appeared in several sports films and TV shows playing himself talking about the fictional sports characters. Some of these shows and films include; Creed III, Happy Gilmore 2, and Chad Powers.

=== Politics ===
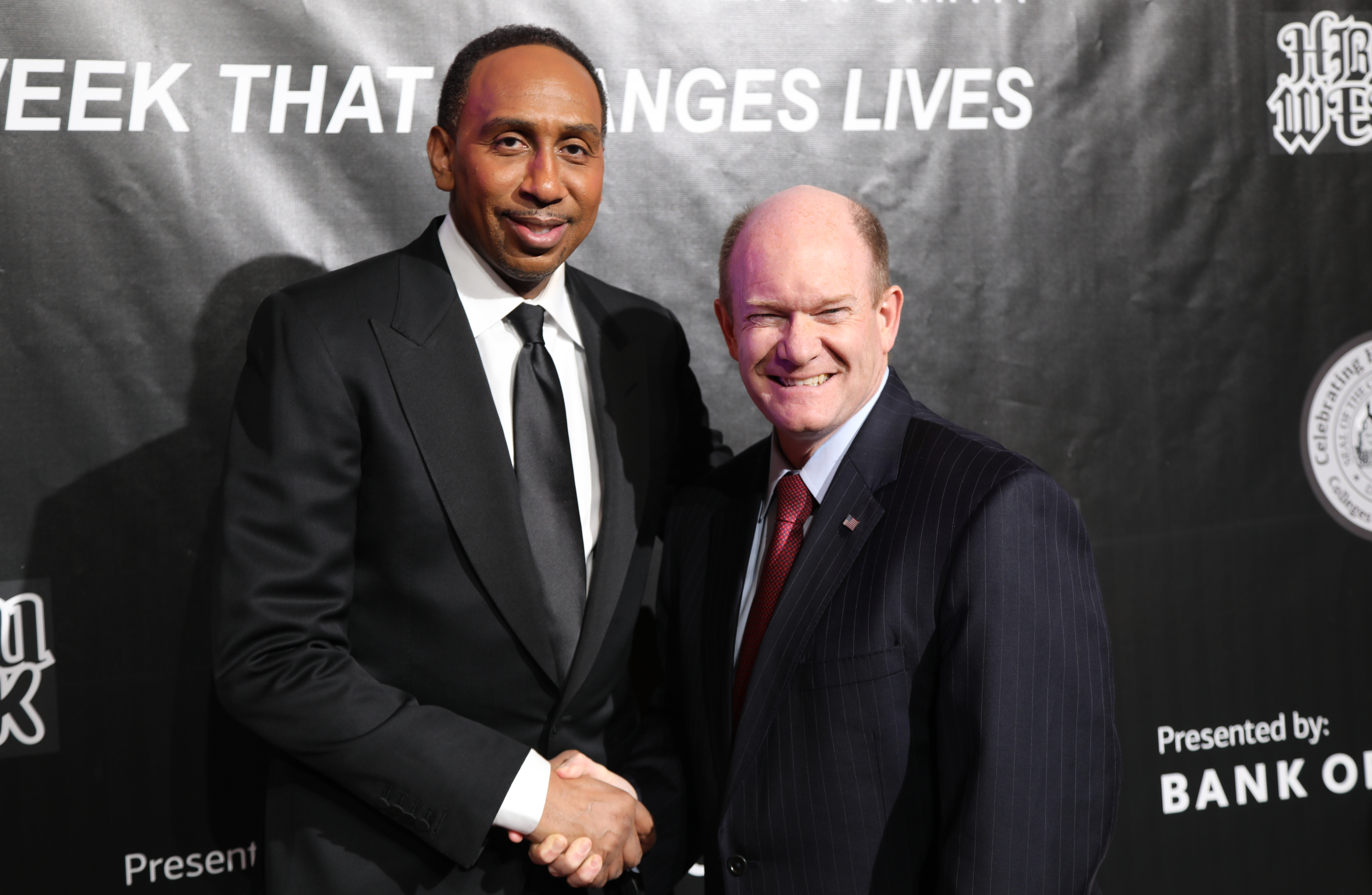
Smith with Delaware senator Chris Coons in 2020

In 2009, Smith described himself as an independent. He describes himself as a "proud capitalist", stating "I believe in making money, and ain't no damn way I'm giving that up" in a 2025 episode of his podcast. Smith has appeared on shows such as The View, and has interviewed politicians on his YouTube channel, including Pennsylvania governor Josh Shapiro and House Minority Leader Hakeem Jeffries.

On November 7, 2024, following the 2024 United States presidential election, Smith stated he would consider running in 2028 if he had a reasonable chance of victory. In February 2025, he stated on his podcast, The Stephen A. Smith Show, that he would entertain the idea of launching a presidential campaign. His comments came after he was included in a Democratic primary nationwide poll, where he received two percent of the vote. However, during an interview on Hannity in the same month, Smith clarified his stance, firmly stating that he has no plans to run for the presidency, and elaborated on his own podcast that while he would run if there was enough popular support, he prefers to be a pundit rather than a politician. In April, he once again changed his mind, and explained that he was considering running for president again due to associates including elected officials urging him to do so. "People have walked up to me, including my own pastor," he stated in an interview with ABC. "You can make a difference in this country to leave the door open for any possibilities two to three years down the line. And that's what I've decided to do," he added.

Smith has also made remarks critical of both the Republican and Democratic parties. During an appearance on Real Time With Bill Maher, Smith announced he voted for Kamala Harris in the 2024 election and that her poor performance in the race made him "feel like [a] damn fool". After President Donald Trump began criticizing diversity, equity, and inclusion (DEI) programs and directing federal agencies to stop those practices, Smith criticized Trump's belief that DEI policies were often used to justify hiring unqualified individuals because they were minority status, explaining to Sean Hannity, "I don't want to hear DEI automatically being about people who happen to be minorities that are unqualified." In a later interview with Chris Cuomo on NewsNation, Smith called Trump's proposition to place the Gaza Strip under American administration, redevelop the land, and relocate its Palestinian population "ridiculous", saying "We shouldn't be hearing about real estate opportunities out of the mouth of the president of the United States."

In May 2025, president Donald Trump entertained the idea of Smith running in the next election. "I love watching him. He's got great entertainment skills, which is very important. People watch him," Trump said of him, which USA Today considered to be a source of skepticism for Smith's campaign, as the president's career also began on TV. Shortly after, Smith told CNN's Jake Tapper that if he ran, he would run as a Democrat, but expressed criticism toward the current state of the party. "If I had to run it would be as a Democrat, but I'm not happy with the Democratic Party," he stated. "It would pretty much need to be purged in order for me to assume that I would want to be associated with them." He described himself as a fiscally conservative candidate, yet socially liberal across the board. He expressed that he believes he could win, because he would tell people one thing, that he "would be interested in serving the American people and doing what's in the best interest of this country," he concluded. Smith also commented on the 2025 New York City mayoral election, saying if the Democratic Party changed to be more like Zohran Mamdani, they would have "no chance" of winning future elections at the federal level because Smith believes that "America is about Capitalism."

== First Take profile ==
=== Catchphrases ===
Smith is known for his frequent use of catchphrases while hosting First Take, such as "blasphemous" when describing something completely outrageous that does not make sense to him. He also frequently refers to former Green Bay Packers quarterback Aaron Rodgers as a "bad man" (with the "A" stretched out for several seconds). Smith has worn Rodgers' jersey on two occasions on First Take in 2017: once following the Dallas Cowboys' elimination at the hands of the Packers and once during a special taping of First Take from Dallas where Smith received boos from the live crowd.

Smith has been known to show a strong hatred towards the Cowboys, often at times mocking them with their "How 'Bout Them Cowboys?" slogan in a sarcastic manner, claiming that they are "an accident waiting to happen", and calling them "a damn disgrace". A song was even made all about Smith's hatred of the Cowboys. He has frequently mocked former Cowboys player and fellow First Take commentator Michael Irvin after losses, as well as other past and present ESPN employees who are Cowboys fans such as Skip Bayless, Will Cain and Marcus Spears.

=== Knowledge about hockey ===
Smith has been known to say many times that he knows absolutely nothing about the sport of hockey, such as by saying that tie games still exist in the sport (the NHL abolished ties following the 2004–05 NHL lockout), despite the presence of three hockey teams from within the New York metropolitan area where he was brought up. In recent years, and especially after ESPN acquired broadcasting rights for the NHL in the United States as of the 2021–2022 season, Smith would talk about hockey more often on both First Take and his new show Stephen A.'s World, such as when he roasted the Edmonton Oilers' Connor McDavid and Leon Draisaitl after they got swept by the Winnipeg Jets in the opening round of the 2021 Stanley Cup Playoffs and equated the Toronto Maple Leafs' playoff failures to that of the Dallas Cowboys'. Smith would also have NHL defenseman P. K. Subban occasionally appear as a guest on both shows.

=== Opposition to recreational marijuana ===
Smith is known for his outspoken stance on athletes, in particular NFL players, and the recreational usage of marijuana (which, despite being legal in some US states, is prohibited by league policy and punishable by fine or suspension). On occasions when players are found to be involved with the drug, Smith may loudly tell them to "Stay off the weed!" Such NFL players include Stedman Bailey, Adrian Peterson, Josh Gordon, Joseph Randle, Randy Gregory, Aldon Smith, LeGarrette Blount, Le'Veon Bell, and Martavis Bryant. NBA players whom Smith has criticized in relation to marijuana include Zach Randolph, who was arrested for possession of marijuana with the intent to sell in August 2017, D'Angelo Russell, who was cited for marijuana possession inside his luggage at New York's LaGuardia Airport while flying to Louisville in May 2019, and Alex Caruso, who was arrested in Texas for marijuana possession in June 2021.

During the final seconds of the fourth quarter of Game 1 of the 2018 NBA Finals, Cleveland Cavaliers player J. R. Smith dribbled the ball out without attempting a shot, believing that his team was winning the game when in fact the score was tied. The Golden State Warriors subsequently defeated the Cavaliers in overtime. The next morning, Stephen A. Smith jokingly delivered his "Stay off the weed!" line at the request of the audience attending a live First Take taping in Oakland, implying that committing a blunder of J. R. Smith's magnitude would only be possible if the player was high at the time. The outburst garnered applause from the audience and his First Take co-hosts. The Warriors ultimately won the series in four games.

== Personal life ==
In a December 11, 2019, interview with GQ, Smith disclosed that he has two daughters. One of his two daughters is Samantha, born in 2008, who made a few appearances alongside her father on ESPN and on Smith's radio show in 2025. Smith's primary residence is in North Caldwell, New Jersey. Smith is a fan of the New York Yankees, New York Knicks, and Pittsburgh Steelers.

== Filmography ==
=== Film ===
| Year | Title | Role | Notes | Ref. |
|---|---|---|---|---|
| 2007 | I Think I Love My Wife | Allan | Romantic comedy film directed by and starring Chris Rock | |
| 2021 | Rumble | Marc Remy | | |
| 2023 | Creed III | Himself | | |
| 2025 | Happy Gilmore 2 | Himself | | |

=== Television ===
| Year | Title | Role | Notes | Ref. |
|---|---|---|---|---|
| 2007 | General Hospital | Reporter | Cameo appearance | |
| 2016–present | General Hospital | Brick | Recurring role; 44 episodes | |
| 2018 | Luke Cage | Himself | Cameo; 1 episode | |
| 2022 | Black-ish | Himself | 1 episode | |
| 2022 | The Best Man: The Final Chapters | Himself | 1 episode | |
| 2025 | Law & Order | Sports agent | 1 episode | |
| 2025 | Chad Powers | Himself | Cameo, 1 episode | |

== Works ==
- 2023: Straight Shooter: A Memoir of Second Chances and First Takes ISBN 978-1982189495

== See also ==
- New Yorkers in journalism
