= 1966–67 Drexel Dragons men's basketball team =

American college basketball season

1966–67 Drexel Dragons men's basketball

MAC College–Southern regular season champions MAC tournament champions

NCAA tournament Regional semifinals, L 53–75
- Conference: Middle Atlantic Conferences
- College–Southern
- Record: 13–10 (11–3 MAC)
- Head coach: Samuel Cozen (15th season)
- Captain: Bill Murphy
- Home arena: Sayre High School

The 1966–67 Drexel Dragons men's basketball team represented Drexel Institute of Technology during the 1966–67 men's basketball season. The Dragons, led by 15th year head coach Samuel Cozen, played their home games at Sayre High School and were members of the College–Southern division of the Middle Atlantic Conferences (MAC).

The team finished the regular season 13–10, and finished in 1st place in the MAC in the regular season.

== Roster ==
1966–67 Drexel Dragons men's basketball team
Players
Coaches

Pos.	#	Name	Height	Weight	Year	Previous school	Hometown
C	53	Joe Hertrich	—	—	Sr	North Penn HS
		Bob Croft	—	—	So
		Bill Murphy (C)	—	—	Sr	St. Thomas More HS
		Cliff Rissell	—	—	So
		Fran Connell	—	—

Head coach

- Samuel Cozen (Temple)

Assistant coach(es)

Legend

- (C) Team captain
- (S) Suspended
- (I) Ineligible
- (W) Walk-on
- Injured
- Current redshirt

== Schedule ==
Date time, TV	Rank^{#}	Opponent^{#}	Result	Record	High points	High rebounds	High assists	Site (attendance) city, state
Regular season
Unknown		Delaware Valley	W 66–59	1–0 (1–0)	–	–	–	
Unknown		Upsala	L 65–79	1–1 (1–1)	–	–	–	
December 17, 1966		at Swarthmore	W 68–55	2–1 (2–1)	–	–	–	
Unknown*		Trenton State ? Semifinal	L 57–68	2–2	–	–	–	
Unknown*		Philadelphia Textile ? 3rd-place game	L 46–74	2–3	–	–	–	
January 4, 1967*; 8:15 pm		at Delaware	L 62–69	2–4	–	–	–	
Unknown		Muhlenberg	W 68–65	3–4 (3–1)	–	–	–	
January 11, 1967		Lebanon Valley	W 81–63	4–4 (4–1)	–	–	–	Sayre High School; Philadelphia, PA
Unknown*		West Chester	L 55–60	4–5	–	–	–	
January 17, 1967		Swarthmore	W 70–51	5–5 (5–1)	–	–	–	Sayre High School; Philadelphia, PA
Unknown		Scranton	L 68–70	5–6 (5–2)	–	–	–	
Unknown		Moravian	W 51–47	6–6 (6–2)	–	–	–	
Unknown		Pennsylvania Military College	W 50–40	7–6 (7–2)	–	–	–	
February 1, 1967*		Rider	W 55–54	8–6	–	–	–	
February 3, 1967*; 8:45 pm		vs. Delaware	L 52–71	8–7	–	–	–	Palestra; Philadelphia, PA
February 8, 1967		Haverford	W 62–43	9–7 (8–2)	–	–	–	Sayre High School; Philadelphia, PA
February 11, 1967		at Johns Hopkins	W 84–51	10–7 (9–2)	–	–	–	
Unknown		Wagner	L 66–80	10–8 (9–3)	–	–	–	
Unknown		Ursinus	W 84–50	11–8 (10–3)	–	–	–	
Unknown		Franklin & Marshall	W 83–60	12–8 (11–3)	–	–	–	
1967 Middle Atlantic Conference men's basketball tournament
Unknown		Ursinus; Championship	W 67–43	13–8	–	–	–	
1967 NCAA College Division basketball tournament
March 10, 1967*		vs. No. 4 Cheyney; Regional semifinals	L 53–75	13–9	–	–	–	32nd Street Armory; Philadelphia, PA
March 11, 1967*		vs. Wagner; Regional third place Game	L 53–61	13–10	–	–	–	32nd Street Armory; Philadelphia, PA
*Non-conference game. ^{#}Rankings from AP. (#) Tournament seedings in parentheses. All times are in Eastern Time.

== Awards ==
Joe Hertrich

- Academic All-American
- MAC Southern Division Most Valuable Player
- MAC All-Star Team
- Eastern College Athletic Association Division III Seasonal All-Star Team
- Philadelphia Basketball Writers Association All-Area College Team

Bill Murphy

- Eastern College Athletic Conference All-East Division III Team
- Philadelphia Basketball Writers Association "Unsung Hero" of the Week
