= Clarence Gaines =

American basketball player and coach (1923–2005)

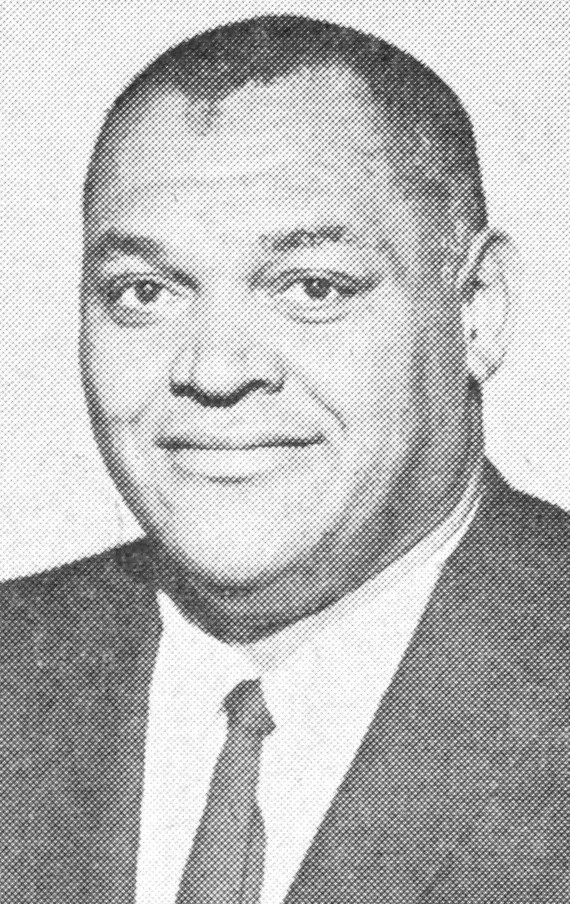
- Gaines, circa 1968

Biographical details
- Born: May 21, 1923; Paducah, Kentucky, U.S.
- Died: April 18, 2005 (aged 81); Winston-Salem, North Carolina, U.S.

Playing career
- 1941–1945: Morgan State

Coaching career (HC unless noted)
- 1946–1993: Winston-Salem State

Head coaching record
- Overall: 828–447

Accomplishments and honors

Championships
- NCAA Championship (1967); 8 CIAA Championship (1953, 1957, 1960, 1961, 1963, 1966, 1970, 1977)

Awards
- NCAA Division II College Coach of the Year (1967); 6× CIAA Coach of the Year (1957, 1961, 1963, 1970, 1975, 1980)
- Basketball Hall of Fame; Inducted in 1982 (profile)
- College Basketball Hall of Fame; Inducted in 2006

Clarence Edward "Big House" Gaines Sr. (May 21, 1923 – April 18, 2005) was an American college men's basketball coach with a 47-year coaching career at Winston-Salem State University in Winston-Salem, North Carolina. Among his numerous honors for his achievements, he is one of the few African Americans to be inducted as a coach into the Basketball Hall of Fame.

Before graduating and becoming a coach, Gaines had a collegiate career as a football player for Morgan State University in Baltimore, Maryland.

== Early years ==
Gaines was born in Paducah, Kentucky to Lester and Olivia Bolen Gaines. Clarence helped his family by working in a garage while in high school. He attended local Lincoln High School where he excelled academically, played basketball, was an All-State football player, and played trumpet in the school band. He graduated as class salutatorian in 1941.

Jim Crow Era segregation laws and the suggestions of a family friend led him to attend Morgan State University (then Morgan State College), a historically black college in Baltimore, Maryland. He entered in the fall of 1941 on a football scholarship.

At Morgan State, Gaines was given his nickname of "Big House": a fellow student saw the 6 ft. 3in., 265 lb Gaines and declared: "You're as big as a house." Gaines played as a lineman for the Bears football team, was a member of the basketball team, and participated in track. Gaines was an All-CIAA selection as a lineman in football all four seasons and twice elected an All-American. When it came to basketball, he said he was "a very average basketball player." In 2004, he explained, "I was an All-America in football, but I was just on the basketball team to have something to do."

Gaines graduated from Morgan State in 1945 with a Bachelor of Science in Chemistry. He intended to go on into dental school, however his college football coach, Edward P. Hurt, suggested that he temporarily go to what was then known as Winston-Salem Teachers College. At the time, the small southern college had one coach for all sports, Brutus Wilson, who was also a Morgan State graduate; Hurt suggested that Gaines would make a good assistant coach. Gaines agreed and went to Winston-Salem.

== Winston-Salem State ==
In 1946, Wilson left for Shaw University, leaving Gaines as the head coach for football and basketball, athletic director, trainer, and ticket manager. He also taught. He served as football coach for three years (1946–49), and in 1948 was named Central Intercollegiate Athletic Association (CIAA) "Football Coach of the Year" after leading his team to an 8–1 season. He dropped coaching football to focus on basketball in 1949. He earned his Master of Arts in Education from Teachers College, Columbia University in 1950.

Gaines coached basketball at Winston-Salem State University (WSSU) from 1946 to 1993, compiling an 828–447 record. He led the Rams to 18 20-win seasons, eight CIAA titles, and in 1967 led WSSU to a Division II NCAA Championship, making the Rams the first basketball program from a historically black college or university to capture an NCAA national championship.

Toward the end of his coaching career, Gaines struggled to recruit student players. The end of the Jim Crow Era laws led to college basketball becoming fully integrated at all levels. This made it difficult to lure star talent to WSSU.

Among Gaines's notable student players were Earl Monroe; Cleo Hill, the first African American from a historically Black college or university to be drafted in the first round by the National Basketball Association (St. Louis Hawks, 1961); and Stephen A. Smith, who became a noted commentator and columnist.

== Accomplishments and recognition ==
As of April 2010, Gaines stands ninth on the NCAA men's basketball coaches win list. When Gaines retired from Winston-Salem State University in 1993, only Rupp had amassed more wins. He was inducted into the Basketball Hall of Fame in 1982. After winning the national title in 1967, he was named the NCAA Division II College Coach of the Year. Gaines was named the CIAA coach of the year a record six times (1957, 61, 63, 70, 75, 80); received the CIAA Basketball Tournament Outstanding Coach Award eight times (1953, 57, 60, 61, 63, 66, 70, 77); was inducted into the CIAA Hall of Fame (1975), NAIA Helms Hall of Fame (1968) and N.C. Sports Hall of Fame (1978) and received the Silver Buffalo Award from the Boy Scouts of America. In 2006, he was named part of the founding class of the College Basketball Hall of Fame.

The C. E. Gaines Center (built 1976), an athletic complex on the WSSU campus and home of the basketball team, is named after him. WSSU's C.E. "Big House" Gaines Athletic Hall of Fame is also named after him.

Gaines was a member in numerous organizations, including the Sigma Pi Phi ("the Boule") and Omega Psi Phi fraternities, Boy Scouts of America, Forsyth County Heart Association, and United States Olympic Committee. He was a basketball consultant for the United States Air Force (Germany, England, Mexico). He served as president of CIAA Basketball Coaches Association from 1972 to 1976; NAIA District Chairman, 1966–72; president of the National Association of Basketball Coaches in 1989; and was a member of the Naismith Basketball Hall of Fame board of trustees.

In January 2005, Gaines was honored during a half-time ceremony at Rupp Arena, home of the University of Kentucky, during a game between the Kentucky and the University of Kansas. Before a capacity crowd of 24,000, he received the designation of "Kentucky Colonel" from Governor Ernie Fletcher, the highest honor a native son of the State of Kentucky can receive.

The Big House Gaines Scholarship was established in 2006 by the Reynolds Rotary Club in recognition of the fact that Gaines was a charter member of that club.

In 2010, the National Sports Media Association (NSMA) established the Clarence "Big House" Gaines College Basketball Coach of the Year Awards for head coaches in NCAA Division I and Division I who might not otherwise receive recognition from "mainstream outlets." The first two awards were presented in 2011.

In 2011, Collegeinsider.com named the Clarence Gaines Award in his honor. It is for the best Division II college basketball coach of each year.

In 2017, the city of Paducah, KY renamed 7th Street Clarence Gaines Street.

== Personal ==
In 1950, Gaines married the former Clara Berry, a teacher of Latin in the local county public school system. They had two children, Lisa Gaines McDonald, a private business consultant and Clarence Edward Gaines Jr., a scout and top advisor for the National Basketball Association's New York Knicks. He and his wife retired to East Winston-Salem.

Gaines died on April 18, 2005, due to complications from a stroke. A large memorial was held at WSSU on April 22, 2005; all conflicting classes were canceled.

== See also ==
- List of college men's basketball coaches with 600 wins
