= Central Intercollegiate Athletic Association =

U.S. athletic conference in NCAA Division II

Central Intercollegiate Athletic Association (CIAA)
- Formerly: Colored Intercollegiate Athletic Association
- Association: NCAA
- Founded: 1912
- Commissioner: Jacqie McWilliams (since 2012)
- Sports fielded: 14; men's: 6; women's: 8
- Division: Division II
- No. of teams: 12
- Headquarters: Charlotte, North Carolina, U.S.
- Region: Mid-Atlantic states, South Atlantic states
- Website: theciaa.com

Locations
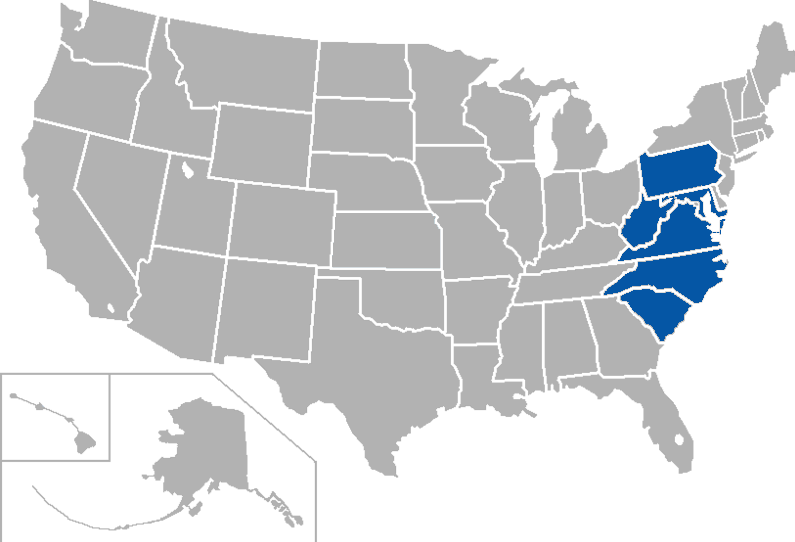

The Central Intercollegiate Athletic Association (CIAA), originally and through 1950 known as the Colored Intercollegiate Athletic Association, is a college athletic conference affiliated with the National Collegiate Athletic Association (NCAA) at the Division II level, whose member institutions consist entirely of historically black colleges and universities (HBCUs).

The thirteen member institutions reside primarily along the central portion of the East Coast of the United States, in the states of Pennsylvania, Maryland, West Virginia, Virginia, North Carolina and South Carolina. Since a majority of the members are in North Carolina, the CIAA moved its headquarters to Charlotte, North Carolina from Hampton, Virginia in August 2015.

The CIAA sponsors 14 annual championships and divides into north and south divisions for some sports. The most notable CIAA sponsored championship is the CIAA Basketball Tournament having become one of the largest college basketball events in the nation.

== History ==
Central Intercollegiate Athletic Association
Location of current CIAA members:
north division members south division members

The CIAA, founded on the campus of Hampton Institute (now Hampton University) in 1912, is the oldest African-American athletic conference in the United States. It was originally known as the Colored Intercollegiate Athletic Association and adopted its current name in December 1950. The conference composes predominantly of historically black colleges and universities (HBCUs) spanning the east coast from Pennsylvania to South Carolina.

Founding leaders were Allen Washington and Charles H. Williams of Hampton Institute (now Hampton University); Ernest J. Marshall of Howard University; George Johnson of Lincoln University (PA); W. E. Atkins, Charles Frazier, and H. P. Hargrave of Shaw University; and J. W. Barco and J. W. Pierce of Virginia Union University.

Football experiences a major resurgence after going through a period of decline at several member universities. Football was absent from the campus of Saint Augustine's University for nearly three decades, before the administration reinstated it in 2002. Shaw University then brought back its football program in 2003, following a hiatus of 24 years.

Lincoln University, a charter member, added varsity football in 2008 and was readmitted to the CIAA after nearly three decades in Division III. Chowan University joined the CIAA in 2008 for football only. On October 14, 2008, the CIAA Board of Directors admitted Chowan as a full member effective July 1, 2009, the first non-HBCU to play in the conference.

On August 27, 2012, the CIAA announced the appointment of Jacqie Carpenter, the first African-American female commissioner to hold the position.

In 2014, a collection of records, including the original 1912 documents leading to the formation of the CIAA and meeting minutes from 1913 to 1922, were sold at auction after being discovered in a storage locker. The lot sold for $11,500 to an unnamed bidder.

On May 22, 2018, Chowan University announced its athletic department will realign with the Conference Carolinas as a full member while maintaining an associate relationship with the CIAA for both football and women's bowling.

On October 4, 2024, the CIAA suspended St. Augustine's membership within the conference for the 2024–25 academic year, citing failure to meet conference compliance requirements and concerns surrounding its ability to meet NCAA sports sponsorship and scheduling requirements. The suspension was extended indefinitely at the CIAA's 2024 Fall Board meeting on December 10, and the CIAA eventually voted to not extend their membership into the 2025–26 academic year at their 2025 Spring Board Meeting on June 20, effectively removing St. Augustine's from the conference.

=== Chronological timeline ===
- 1912 – The CIAA was founded as the Colored Intercollegiate Athletic Association (CIAA). Charter member included Hampton Institute (now Hampton University), Howard University, Lincoln University of Pennsylvania; Shaw University and Virginia Union University, beginning the 1912–13 academic year.
- 1920 – Virginia State College (now Virginia State University) joined the CIAA in the 1920–21 academic year.
- 1921 – Virginia Theological Seminary and College (now the Virginia University of Lynchburg) joined the CIAA in the 1921–22 academic year.
- 1923 – Saint Paul's Normal and Industrial School (later Saint Paul's Polytechnic Institute and then Saint Paul's College) joined the CIAA in the 1923–24 academic year.
- 1924 – The Agricultural and Technical College of North Carolina (now North Carolina Agricultural & Technical State University) joined the CIAA in the 1924–25 academic year.
- 1926 – Johnson C. Smith University joined the CIAA in the 1926–27 academic year.
- 1928 – North Carolina College at Durham (now North Carolina Central University) joined the CIAA in the 1928–29 academic year.
- 1929 – Morgan College (now Morgan State University) joined the CIAA in the 1929–30 academic year.
- 1931 – Livingstone College joined the CIAA in the 1931–32 academic year.
- 1932 – Bluefield State Teachers College (now Bluefield State University) joined the CIAA in the 1932–33 academic year.
- 1933 – Saint Augustine's College (now Saint Augustine's University) joined the CIAA in the 1933–34 academic year.
- 1942 – West Virginia State College (now West Virginia State University) joined the CIAA in the 1942–43 academic year.
- 1945 – Delaware State College (now Delaware State University) and Winston-Salem Teachers College (now Winston-Salem State University) joined the CIAA in the 1945–46 academic year.
- 1950 – The CIAA has been rebranded as the Central Intercollegiate Athletic Association (CIAA) in the 1950–51 academic year.
- 1954 – VUL left the CIAA after the 1953–54 academic year.
- 1954 – Fayetteville State Teachers College (now Fayetteville State University) and Maryland State College at Princess Anne (now the University of Maryland–Eastern Shore) joined the CIAA in the 1954–55 academic year.
- 1955 – Bluefield State and West Virginia State left the CIAA to join the West Virginia Intercollegiate Athletic Conference (WVIAC) after the 1954–55 academic year.
- 1957 – Elizabeth City State Teachers College (now Elizabeth City State University) joined the CIAA in the 1957–58 academic year.
- 1960 – Lincoln (Pa.) left the CIAA after the 1959–60 academic year.
- 1962 – Norfolk Polytechnic College (now Norfolk State University) joined the CIAA in the 1962–63 academic year.
- 1970 – Delaware State, Howard, Maryland–Eastern Shore (UMES), Morgan State, North Carolina A&T and North Carolina Central left the CIAA to form the Mid-Eastern Athletic Conference (MEAC) after the 1969–70 academic year.
- 1979 – Bowie State College (now Bowie State University) joined the CIAA in the 1979–80 academic year.
- 1980 – North Carolina Central rejoined the CIAA in the 1980–81 academic year.
- 1995 – Hampton left the CIAA to join the MEAC after the 1994–95 academic year.
- 1996 – Norfolk State left the CIAA to join the MEAC after the 1995–96 academic year.
- 2006 – Winston-Salem State left the CIAA to join the MEAC after the 2005–06 academic year.
- 2007 – North Carolina Central left the CIAA for a second time to rejoin the MEAC after the 2006–07 academic year.
- 2008 – Lincoln (Pa.) rejoined the CIAA in the 2008–09 academic year.
- 2008 – Chowan University joined the CIAA as an associate member for football in the 2008 fall season (2008–09 academic year).
- 2009 – Chowan upgraded to join the CIAA as a full member for all sports in the 2009–10 academic year.
- 2010 – Winston–Salem State rejoined the CIAA in the 2010–11 academic year.
- 2011 – Saint Paul's left the CIAA after the school announced that it was discontinuing its athletics program after the 2010–11 academic year.
- 2018 – Claflin University joined the CIAA in the 2018–19 academic year.
- 2019 – Chowan left the CIAA to join the Conference Carolinas (CC) after the 2018–19 academic year; while it remained in the conference as an associate member for football and women's bowling, beginning the 2019–20 academic year.
- 2021 – Chowan left the CIAA as an associate member for women's bowling after the 2021 spring season (2020–21 academic year).
- 2023 – Chowan left the CIAA as an associate member for football after the 2022 fall season (2022–23 academic year).
- 2023 – Bluefield State rejoined the CIAA in the 2023–24 academic year.
- 2025 – Saint Augustine's was removed from the CIAA beginning with the 2025–26 academic year due to compliance and operational concerns.

== Member schools ==
=== Current members ===
The CIAA currently has 12 full members, seven are public schools and five are private schools:

Institution	Location	Founded	Affiliation	Enrollment	Nickname	Joined (Note: Represents the calendar year when fall sports competition begins.)	Colors
Bluefield State University	Bluefield, West Virginia	1895	Public	1,313	Big Blue	1932; 2023 (Note: Bluefield State left the CIAA after the 1954–55 school year before rejoining in the 2023–24 school year.)	
Bowie State University	Bowie, Maryland	1865	Public	6,353	Bulldogs	1979	
Claflin University	Orangeburg, South Carolina	1869	United Methodist	1,960	Panthers	2018	
Elizabeth City State University	Elizabeth City, North Carolina	1891	Public	2,261	Vikings	1957	
Fayetteville State University	Fayetteville, North Carolina	1867	Public	7,113	Broncos	1954	
Johnson C. Smith University	Charlotte, North Carolina	1867	Presbyterian (PCUSA)	1,302	Golden Bulls	1926	
Lincoln University	Oxford, Pennsylvania	1854	State related	1,848	Lions	1912; 2008 (Note: Lincoln (Pa.) left the CIAA after the 1959–60 school year before rejoining in the 2008–09 school year.)	
Livingstone College	Salisbury, North Carolina	1879	A.M.E. Church	814	Blue Bears	1931	
Shaw University	Raleigh, North Carolina	1865	Baptist (NBCUSA)	962	Bears	1912	
Virginia State University	Ettrick, Virginia	1882	Public	5,605	Trojans	1920	
Virginia Union University	Richmond, Virginia	1865	Baptist (ABHMS)	1,783	Panthers	1912	
Winston–Salem State University	Winston-Salem, North Carolina	1892	Public	4,192	Rams	1945; 2010 (Note: Winston-Salem State left the CIAA after the 2005–06 school year to join the Mid-Eastern Athletic Conference (MEAC), before rejoining in the 2010–11 school year.)	

=== Former members ===
The CIAA had 13 former full members, all but 6 of which were public schools:

Institution	Location	Founded	Affiliation	Enrollment	Nickname	Joined (Note: Represents the calendar year when fall sports competition begins.)	Left (Note: Represents the calendar year when spring sports competition ends.)	Current conference
Chowan University	Murfreesboro, North Carolina	1848	Baptist (BSCNC)	1,316	Hawks	2009	2019	Carolinas (CC)
Delaware State University	Dover, Delaware	1891	Public (Note: Delaware State is officially defined as a "privately governed, state-assisted" institution. This status is similar to that of New York State's statutory colleges, mostly housed at Cornell University, or members of Pennsylvania's Commonwealth System of Higher Education.)	4,768	Hornets	1945	1970	Mid-Eastern (MEAC) (Note: Currently an NCAA Division I athletic conference.)
Hampton University	Hampton, Virginia	1868	Nonsectarian	4,321	Pirates	1912	1995	Coastal (CAA)
Howard University	Washington, D.C.	1867	Nonsectarian	9,399	Bison	1912	1970	Mid-Eastern (MEAC)
University of Maryland Eastern Shore	Princess Anne, Maryland (Note: UMES has a Princess Anne mailing address, but is physically located in unincorporated Somerset County.)	1886	Public	2,888	Hawks	1954	1970	Mid-Eastern (MEAC)
Morgan State University	Baltimore, Maryland	1867	Public	7,763	Bears	1929	1970	Mid-Eastern (MEAC)
Norfolk State University	Norfolk, Virginia	1935	Public	5,601	Spartans	1962	1996	Mid-Eastern (MEAC)
North Carolina A&T State University	Greensboro, North Carolina	1891	Public	13,332	Aggies	1924	1970	Coastal (CAA)
North Carolina Central University	Durham, North Carolina	1910	Public	8,011	Eagles	1928, 1980	1970, 2007 (Note: North Carolina Central previously withdrew from the CIAA from 1970–71 to 1979–80.)	Mid-Eastern (MEAC)
Saint Augustine's University	Raleigh, North Carolina	1867	Episcopal	N/A	Falcons	1933	2025 (Note: Saint Augustine's CIAA membership was suspended for the 2024–25 school year before being terminated beginning with the 2025–26 school year.)	N/A (Note: Saint Augustine's discontinued its athletic program after the 2024–25 school year.)
Saint Paul's College	Lawrenceville, Virginia	1888	Episcopal	N/A	Tigers	1923	2011	N/A (Note: Saint Paul's discontinued its athletic program after the 2010–11 school year, before the school closed in 2013.)
Virginia University of Lynchburg	Lynchburg, Virginia	1886	Christian	750	Dragons	1921	1954	NCCAA Independent
West Virginia State University	Institute, West Virginia	1891	Public	3,100	Yellow Jackets	1942	1955	Mountain East (MEC)

=== Former associate members ===
The CIAA had one former associate member, which was also a private school:

Institution	Location	Founded	Affiliation	Enrollment	Nickname	Joined (Note: Represents the calendar year when fall sports competition begins.)	Left (Note: Represents the calendar year when spring sports competition ends.)	CIAA sport(s)	Primary conference
Chowan University (Note: Chowan was a full member of the CIAA from 2009–10 to 2018–19, before joining the Conference Carolinas (CC); but had prior to that competed for football only during the 2008 fall season (2008–09 school year).)	Murfreesboro, North Carolina	1848	Baptist (BSCNC)	1,316	Hawks	2008^{fb.}	2009^{fb.}	football	Carolinas (CC)
Chowan University	Murfreesboro, North Carolina	1848	Baptist (BSCNC)	1,316	Hawks	2019^{fb.}	2023^{fb.}	football	Carolinas (CC)
Chowan University	Murfreesboro, North Carolina	1848	Baptist (BSCNC)	1,316	Hawks	2019^{w.bowl.}	2021^{w.bowl.}	women's bowling	Carolinas (CC)

=== Membership timeline ===
Full member (all sports) Full member (non-football) Associate member (football) Associate member (sport)

== Sports ==
A divisional format is used for basketball (M / W), bowling, softball, tennis (W), and volleyball.
North
- Bluefield State
- Bowie State
- Elizabeth City State
- Lincoln
- Virginia State
- Virginia Union
South
- Claflin
- Fayetteville State
- Johnson C. Smith
- Livingstone
- Shaw
- Winston-Salem State

Teams in Central Intercollegiate Athletic Association competition
Sport	Men's	Women's
Basketball	12	12
Bowling	–	9
Cross country	12	12
Football	11	–
Golf	8	–
Softball	–	12
Tennis	–	9
Track and Field (Indoor)	8	10
Track and Field (Outdoor)	8	11
Volleyball	–	12

=== Men's sponsored sports by school ===
School	Basketball	Cross Country	Football	Golf	Track & Field (Indoor)	Track & Field (Outdoor)	Total CIAA Sports
Bluefield State	Yes	Yes	Yes	Yes	Yes	Yes	6
Bowie State	Yes	Yes	Yes	No	Yes	Yes	5
Claflin	Yes	Yes	No	No	Yes	Yes	4
Elizabeth City State	Yes	Yes	Yes	Yes	No	No	4
Fayetteville State	Yes	Yes	Yes	Yes	No	No	4
Johnson C. Smith	Yes	Yes	Yes	Yes	Yes	Yes	6
Lincoln	Yes	Yes	Yes	No	Yes	Yes	5
Livingstone	Yes	Yes	Yes	Yes	Yes	Yes	6
Shaw	Yes	Yes	Yes	No	No	No	3
Virginia State	Yes	Yes	Yes	Yes	Yes	Yes	6
Virginia Union	Yes	Yes	Yes	Yes	Yes	Yes	6
Winston-Salem State	Yes	Yes	Yes	Yes	No	No	4
Totals	12	12	11	8	8	8	59

Men's varsity sports not sponsored by the Central Intercollegiate Athletic Association which are played by CIAA schools:

School	Baseball	Lacrosse	Soccer	Tennis	Wrestling
Bluefield State	IND			IND	CC
Claflin	PBC				
Johnson C. Smith				IND	
Lincoln	CACC				
Shaw			IND (Note: Joining CC in 2027.)	IND	
Virginia State	IND	PBC	IND	SIAC	

=== Women's sponsored sports by school ===
School	Basketball	Bowling ^{‡}	Cross Country	Softball	Tennis	Track & Field (Indoor)	Track & Field (Outdoor)	Volleyball	Total CIAA Sports
Bluefield State	Yes	Yes	Yes	Yes	Yes	Yes	Yes	Yes	8
Bowie State	Yes	Yes	Yes	Yes	Yes	Yes	Yes	Yes	8
Claflin	Yes	No	Yes	Yes	No	Yes	Yes	Yes	6
Elizabeth City State	Yes	Yes	Yes	Yes	Yes	No	No	Yes	6
Fayetteville State	Yes	Yes	Yes	Yes	No	Yes	Yes	Yes	7
Johnson C. Smith	Yes	Yes	Yes	Yes	Yes	Yes	Yes	Yes	8
Lincoln	Yes	No	Yes	Yes	No	Yes	Yes	Yes	6
Livingstone	Yes	Yes	Yes	Yes	Yes	Yes	Yes	Yes	8
Shaw	Yes	Yes	Yes	Yes	Yes	No	Yes	Yes	7
Virginia State	Yes	Yes	Yes	Yes	Yes	Yes	Yes	Yes	8
Virginia Union	Yes	Yes	Yes	Yes	Yes	Yes	Yes	Yes	8
Winston-Salem State	Yes	No	Yes	Yes	Yes	Yes	Yes	Yes	7
Totals	12	9	12	12	9	10	11	12	87

- ^{‡} — D-I sport through 2026–27, after which a separate D-II NCAA championship will be established

Women's varsity sports not sponsored by the Central Intercollegiate Athletic Association which are played by CIAA schools:

School	Golf	Lacrosse	Soccer	Wrestling
Bluefield State	IND		IND	CC (Note: De facto Conference Carolinas affiliate as part of South Atlantic Conference Carolinas.)
Lincoln			CACC	
Shaw			IND	
Virginia State		GSC	IND	

== Conference facilities ==
School	Football		Basketball	
School	Stadium	Capacity	Arena	Capacity
Bluefield State	Mitchell Stadium	10,000	Ned E. Shott Gym	1,500
Bowie State	Bulldog Stadium	2,964	A.C. Jordan Arena	2,200
Claflin	non-football school		Edward Tullis Arena	3,000
Elizabeth City State	Roebuck Stadium	6,500	R. L. Vaughn Center	5,000
Fayetteville State	Luther "Nick" Jeralds Stadium	5,520	Felton J. Capel Arena	4,000
Johnson C. Smith	Irwin Belk Complex	4,500	Brayboy Gymnasium	2,316
Lincoln	Lincoln University Stadium	2,600	Manuel Rivero Hall	3,000
Livingstone	Alumni Memorial Stadium	5,500	William Trent Gymnasium	1,500
Shaw	Durham County Stadium	8,500	C.C. Spaulding Gym	1,500
Virginia State	Rogers Stadium	7,909	VSU Multi-Purpose Center	6,000
Virginia Union	Hovey Field	10,000	Barco-Stevens Hall	2,000
Winston–Salem State	Bowman Gray Stadium	22,000	C.E. Gaines Center	3,200

== CIAA Basketball Tournament ==
The CIAA is the first NCAA Division II conference to have its tournament televised as part of Championship Week on ESPN. Over 100,000 fans and spectators are in attendance annually and it has become one of the largest college basketball events in the nation. During the week of the tournament, there are many high-profile social and celebratory events associated with the event. The last day of the tournament is known as "Super Saturday" in which the men's and women's tournament champions are crowned. For 15 years, the tournament had an annual $55 million economic impact on Charlotte, North Carolina and was consistently the largest event held in the city every year. The conference was offered better incentives to move it to Baltimore, Maryland, in 2021, where it will remain at least through 2025.

Men's tournament results

Year	Champion	Venue (Location)
1946	North Carolina College	Turner's Arena (Washington, DC)
1947	Virginia State	Turner's Arena (Washington, DC)
1948	West Virginia State	Turner's Arena (Washington, DC)
1949	West Virginia State	Uline Arena (Washington, DC)
1950	North Carolina Central	Uline Arena (Washington, DC)
1951	Virginia Union	Uline Arena (Washington, DC)
1952	Virginia Union	Hurt Gymnasium (Baltimore, MD)
1953	Winston-Salem State	McDougald Gymnasium (Durham, NC)
1954	Virginia Union	McDougald Gymnasium (Durham, NC)
1955	Virginia Union	McDougald Gymnasium (Durham, NC)
1956	Maryland State	McDougald Gymnasium (Durham, NC)
1957	Winston-Salem State	McDougald Gymnasium (Durham, NC)
1958	North Carolina A&T	McDougald Gymnasium (Durham, NC)
1959	North Carolina A&T	McDougald Gymnasium (Durham, NC)
1960	Winston-Salem State	Greensboro Coliseum (Greensboro, NC)
1961	Winston-Salem State	War Memorial Coliseum (Winston-Salem, NC)
1962	North Carolina A&T	War Memorial Coliseum (Winston-Salem, NC)
1963	Winston-Salem State	War Memorial Coliseum (Winston-Salem, NC)
1964	North Carolina A&T	Greensboro Coliseum (Greensboro, NC)
1965	Norfolk State	Greensboro Coliseum (Greensboro, NC)
1966	Winston-Salem State	Greensboro Coliseum (Greensboro, NC)
1967	North Carolina A&T	Greensboro Coliseum (Greensboro, NC)
1968	Norfolk State	Greensboro Coliseum (Greensboro, NC)
1969	Elizabeth City State	Greensboro Coliseum (Greensboro, NC)
1970	Winston-Salem State	Greensboro Coliseum (Greensboro, NC)
1971	Norfolk State	Greensboro Coliseum (Greensboro, NC)
1972	Norfolk State	Greensboro Coliseum (Greensboro, NC)
1973	Fayetteville State	Greensboro Coliseum (Greensboro, NC)
1974	Norfolk State	Greensboro Coliseum (Greensboro, NC)
1975	Norfolk State	Greensboro Coliseum (Greensboro, NC)
1976	Norfolk State	Hampton Coliseum (Hampton, VA)
1977	Winston-Salem State	Hampton Coliseum (Hampton, VA)
1978	Norfolk State	Hampton Coliseum (Hampton, VA)
1979	Virginia Union	Norfolk Scope (Norfolk, VA)
1980	Virginia Union	Norfolk Scope (Norfolk, VA)
1981	Elizabeth City State	Norfolk Scope (Norfolk, VA)
1982	Hampton	Norfolk Scope (Norfolk, VA)
1983	Hampton	Norfolk Scope (Norfolk, VA)
1984	Norfolk State	Norfolk Scope (Norfolk, VA)
1985	Virginia Union	Norfolk Scope (Norfolk, VA)
1986	Norfolk State	Richmond Coliseum (Richmond, VA)
1987	Virginia Union	Richmond Coliseum (Richmond, VA)
1988	Virginia State	Norfolk Scope (Norfolk, VA)
1989	Virginia State	Norfolk Scope (Norfolk, VA)
1990	Norfolk State	Norfolk Scope (Norfolk, VA)
1991	Hampton	Richmond Coliseum (Richmond, VA)
1992	Virginia Union	Richmond Coliseum (Richmond, VA)
1993	Virginia Union	Richmond Coliseum (Richmond, VA)
1994	Virginia Union	LJVM Coliseum (Winston-Salem, NC)
1995	Virginia Union	LJVM Coliseum (Winston-Salem, NC)
1996	Norfolk State	LJVM Coliseum (Winston-Salem, NC)
1997	Saint Augustine's	LJVM Coliseum (Winston-Salem, NC)
1998	Virginia Union	LJVM Coliseum (Winston-Salem, NC)
1999	Winston-Salem State	LJVM Coliseum (Winston-Salem, NC)
2000	Winston-Salem State	Entertainment & Sports Arena (Raleigh, NC)
2001	Johnson C. Smith	Entertainment & Sports Arena (Raleigh, NC)
2002	Shaw	Entertainment & Sports Arena (Raleigh, NC)
2003	Bowie State	RBC Center (Raleigh, NC)
2004	Virginia Union	RBC Center (Raleigh, NC)
2005	Virginia Union	RBC Center (Raleigh, NC)
2006	Virginia Union	Charlotte Bobcats Arena (Charlotte, NC)
2007	Elizabeth City State	Charlotte Bobcats Arena (Charlotte, NC)
2008	Johnson C. Smith	Charlotte Bobcats Arena (Charlotte, NC)
2009	Johnson C. Smith	Time Warner Cable Arena (Charlotte, NC)
2010	Saint Augustine's	Time Warner Cable Arena (Charlotte, NC)
2011	Shaw	Time Warner Cable Arena (Charlotte, NC)
2012	Winston-Salem State	Time Warner Cable Arena (Charlotte, NC)
2013	Bowie State	Time Warner Cable Arena (Charlotte, NC)
2014	Livingstone	Time Warner Cable Arena (Charlotte, NC)
2015	Livingstone	Time Warner Cable Arena (Charlotte, NC)
2016	Virginia State	Time Warner Cable Arena (Charlotte, NC)
2017	Bowie State	Bojangles' Coliseum (Charlotte, NC); Spectrum Center (Charlotte, NC)
2018	Virginia Union	Bojangles' Coliseum (Charlotte, NC); Spectrum Center (Charlotte, NC)
2019	Virginia State	Bojangles' Coliseum (Charlotte, NC); Spectrum Center (Charlotte, NC)
2020	Winston-Salem State	Bojangles' Coliseum (Charlotte, NC); Spectrum Center (Charlotte, NC)
2022	Fayetteville State	Royal Farms Arena (Baltimore, MD)
2023	Winston-Salem State	Royal Farms Arena (Baltimore, MD)
2024	Lincoln (PA)	CFG Bank Arena (Baltimore, MD)

== CIAA cheerleading ==
One of the signature events of "Super Saturday" at the CIAA Basketball Tournament is the Cheer Exhibition. At the exhibition, CIAA cheer squads showcase elaborate routines to entertain spectators and display their talents. Every cheerleading team in the CIAA is a "Stomp-N-Shake" squad which is a unique style of cheer that is most common among historically Black colleges and schools located in the East Coast region.

The CIAA is one of the only conferences in the country that has an annual All-Conference Cheerleading Team. The All-Conference Cheerleading Team is a recognition bestowed on select cheerleaders in the conference that exemplify the epitome of school spirit, leadership, athleticism, and academic excellence.

Institution	Squad name
Bluefield State University	The "Beautiful Blue"
Bowie State University	The "Golden Girls"
Claflin University	The "Panther Dolls"
Elizabeth City State University	The "D'Lytes"
Fayetteville State University	"Cheer Phi Smoov"
Johnson C. Smith University	The "Luv-A-Bulls"
Lincoln University	The "Fe Fe's"
Livingstone College	The "La La's"
Shaw University	The "Chi Chi's"
Virginia State University	The "Woo Woo's"
Virginia Union University	The "Rah Rah's"
Winston-Salem State University	The "Powerhouse of Red and White"
