= Hurt Gymnasium =

Building on the campus of Morgan State University

Coordinates: 39°20′39″N 76°35′4″W

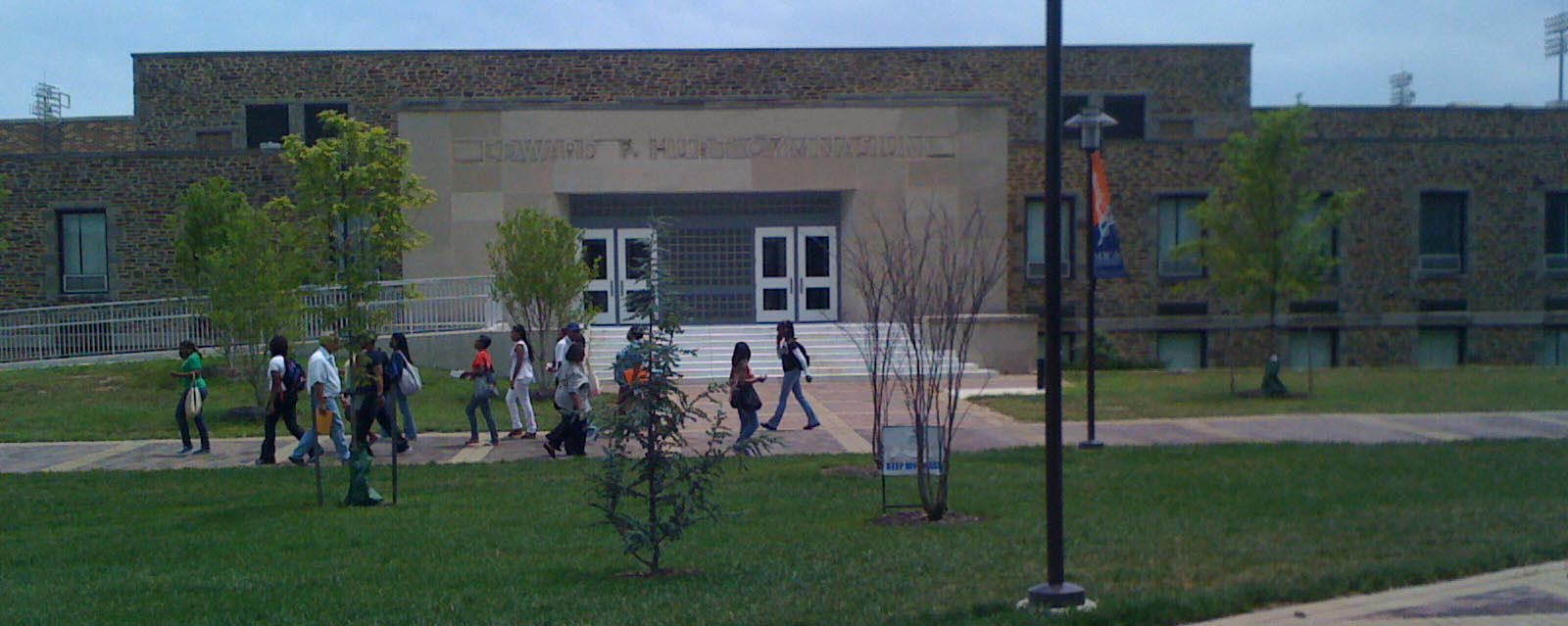
Hurt Gymnasium

The Edward P. Hurt Gymnasium is a 1,000-seat gymnasium on the campus of Morgan State University in Baltimore, Maryland. The gymnasium, built just west of Hughes Stadium, was opened in 1950 and named for Edward P. Hurt, the longtime coach of the basketball, football and track teams at Morgan State. The gymnasium was the home of the Morgan State Bears men's basketball team from 1950 to the opening of Talmadge L. Hill Field House. Hurt Gymnasium was the site of the first interracial American basketball game played south of the Mason–Dixon line on February 12, 1952, which ended with a Bears' 65–63 loss to Loyola College in Maryland. Since the opening of Hill Field House, the building still serves as a field house for Hughes, as well as housing offices for the Health & Physical Education departments, intramural athletics and a practice space for visiting teams.
