= C. E. Gaines Center =

Basketball arena in Winston-Salem, North Carolina

Coordinates: 36.0890°N 80.2236°W

The C.E. Gaines Center is a basketball arena on the campus of Winston-Salem State University. It is named for former WSSU men's basketball coach Clarence "Bighouse" Gaines, who led the men's basketball team for 47 years. The facility has the ability to seat 2,750 spectators and opened in 1981.
